The cultivation of cannabis in Italy has a long history dating back to Roman times, when it was primarily used to produce hemp ropes, although pollen records from core samples show that Cannabaceae plants were present in the Italian peninsula since at least the Late Pleistocene, while the earliest evidence of their use dates back to the Bronze Age. The mass cultivation of industrial cannabis for the production of hemp fiber in Italy really took off during the period of the Maritime Republics and the Age of Sail, and continued well after the Italian Unification, only to experience a sudden decline during the second half of the 20th century, with the introduction of synthetic fibers and the start of the war on drugs, and only recently it is slowly experiencing a resurgence.

At present, cannabis is legal in Italy for medical and industrial uses, although it is strictly regulated, while it is decriminalized for recreational uses. In particular, the possession of small amounts of marijuana for personal use is a civil infraction. The possible sanctions for possession vary from the issuing of a diffida to first offenders, that is an injunction not to use the drug again; to the temporary suspension of certain personal documents (e.g. driving licenses) for repeat offenders. Conversely, the unauthorized sale of cannabis-related products is illegal and punishable with imprisonment, as is the unlicensed cultivation of cannabis, although recent court cases have effectively established the legality of cultivating small amounts of cannabis for exclusively personal use. The licensed cultivation of cannabis for medical and industrial purposes requires the use of certified seeds; however, there is no need for authorization in order to plant certified seeds with minimal levels of psychoactive compounds (a.k.a. cannabis light).

History of cannabis in Italy

Prehistory

The family of Cannabaceae includes the two genera of cannabis and humulus, with the former believed to be native exclusively to Asia, while the latter also to Europe. According to Greek historian and geographer Herodotus, the Scythians brought hemp from Central Asia to Europe during their migrations around 1500 B.C., while the Teutons were a major factor in the spread of the cultivation of hemp throughout Europe. Another proposed theory is that hemp may have been introduced into the continent by the earliest incursions of the Aryans into Thrace and Western Europe, although no evidence of its presence was found in the lake dwellings of Switzerland and northern Italy. Still other sources attribute the introduction of hemp into Italy to the arrivals of both the Scythians and the Illyrians between the 10th and the 8th centuries B.C. while, by the 6th and 5th centuries B.C., hemp cultivation was present throughout Italy.

Nevertheless, the oldest evidence of the presence of cannabis and humulus in central Italy dates back to the Late Glacial, as inferred from sediment cores extracted from the Albano and Nemi lakes, in which pollen records show an increase in the human influence on the local vegetation. In particular, humulus pollen values increase during the mid Holocene, while hemp pollen values start to rise from about 3000 cal BP (i.e. 1050 B.C.) onwards, reaching their earliest peak during the 1st century A.D., as a clear consequence of the cultivation of hemp by the Romans, although the pre-Roman trends can be attributed to natural sources, and possibly to anthropogenic sources as well. Later peaks in the pollen records also show clear evidence of hemp cultivation during the Medieval period.

In terms of the earliest evidence of the processing of hemp for the production of strings and fabrics in Italy, three micro-fragments of what appear to be hemp fibers were detected through a scanning electron microscope in the dental calculi of three female individuals from the Early Bronze Age. Furthermore, the analysis of the teeth of 28 females and one male from the same period, revealed evidence of activity-induced dental modifications that are consistent with yarn production, or weaving preparation, of small-diameter threads, which were repeatedly pulled across the fronts and sides of the individuals' upper incisors and canines. All the examined individuals were buried in an ancient cemetery located in Gricignano di Aversa, in southern Italy, and traces of hemp were also found attached to a metal blade, possibly the remains of a fabric sheath, in the tomb of an adult male within the same site. These findings show the importance that hemp fabrics had in the region at the time, as well as clear gender-based role divisions in the manufacturing of fibers.

Ancient Rome

One of the earliest author from the Roman Republic to mention industrial hemp was satirist Gaius Lucilius, in the 2nd century B.C., who referenced thomices, an ancient greek word used to indicate lightly twisted ropes obtained from rough hemp and broom, out of which cords were made. In the 1st century A.D., Roman naturalist Pliny the Elder described in his Naturalis Historia the cultivation and use of cannabis plants in the Roman Empire, both for industrial and medical purposes, while hemp is also mentioned in the satires of Persius and Juvenal. The hemp fiber was mainly used to produce ropes, sheets, wickers, and nets; in particular Pliny mentions three Alabandica varieties to be the best ones to be used for hunting nets, the variety cultivated in Mylasa to be the second best, and the hemp grown in the Sabine territory to be particularly tall. Furthermore, archaeological excavations at Pompeii, in Campania felix (i.e. part of what is now Campania), unearthed samples of hemp textiles that had been preserved by the eruption of Mt. Vesuvius in 79 A.D., reportedly including cloth sandals made of hemp, although linen was generally preferred in antiquity for the production of canvas, sails, and clothing.

According to Pliny, Roman farmers would sow hemp seeds during spring and harvest the ripe hemp seeds after the autumn equinox, after which they were dried in the sun, or the wind, or by the smoke of a fire, while the hemp plants were plucked after the vintage, to be then peeled and cleaned. Moreover, according to the De re rustica by contemporary agricultural writer Lucius Columella, hemp plants require either rich, manured, and well-watered soil, or alternatively soil that is level, moist, and deeply worked. Ancient Romans would plant six hemp seeds per square foot toward the end of February however, if the weather was rainy, sowing could be done up to the spring equinox without harming the crop.

In 2018, excavations on the eastern bank of the ancient Natiso cum Turro river of Aquileia, in the area of Venetia et Histria that is now Friuli-Venezia Giulia, revealed the first system of basins from the Roman world that is known to have been used for the maceration of hemp, as inferred from archaeobotanical and archaeo-palynological studies of the site. The long and shallow pools were dated between the late 2nd – early 3rd century A.D. and the late 3rd – early 4th century A.D.; they were delimited by parapets made of clay, sand, and tiny pebbles; and they were coated with thin layers of cocciopesto for waterproofing. Similarly to more recent water retting procedures, the harvested stalks of cannabis sativa were bundled into sheaves and then submerged into either stagnant or running water by tying them to dedicated poles, in order to extract the fiber.

Cannabis consumption

In Italia, different parts of the hemp plants were used for various culinary purposes, in particular Pliny mentions hemp seeds being stored in pots for later use and lasting for as much as one year, while the stalks and branches were used as vegetables. In terms of the contemporary beliefs on cannabis plants and the effects of their personal use, according to Pliny, wild hemp first grew in woods and had darker and rougher leaves, while its seeds were said to cause impotence. The juice derived from it was used to drive out worms and other creatures that could enter the ears, although it would cause headache as a side effect, and it was said to be so potent that it was able to coagulate water when it was poured into it. Furthermore, when the hemp juice was mixed with water and then drunk by beasts of burden, it was said to be able to regulate their bowels. Moreover, hemp roots boiled in water were thought to ease cramped joints, gout, and similar violent pains, while they could also be applied raw to burns, but they would be changed before getting dry.

The ability of boiled cannabis roots to lessen inflammation was also attested by contemporary Greek physician and botanist Pedanius Dioscorides in his De Materia Medica, a pharmacopoeia that mainly focuses on medicinal plants. In regard to the recreational use of cannabis in the Roman Empire, 2nd century Greek physician and philosopher Claudius Galenus wrote that it was customary in Italia to serve small cannabis-based cakes for dessert, whose seeds would reportedly create a feeling of warmth and, if consumed in large quantities, affect the head by emitting a warm and toxic vapor.

Middle Ages

The mass cultivation of industrial cannabis in Medieval Italy started during the High Middle Ages, with the demographic and agricultural recoveries, the rise of Medieval communes and the Maritime Republics, and the increase of their trade in the Mediterranean Sea. Between 1304 and 1309, Bolognese jurist and landowner Pietro de' Crescenzi compiled an agricultural treatise entitled De agricultura vulgare, alternatively known as the Ruralia commoda, which includes a section on the cultivation of industrial cannabis at the time.

In the treatise, hemp is described as having the same nature as flax, namely requiring similar air and soil, although the latter does not need to be ploughed as much. Nevertheless, for the production of ropes, the seeds must be planted in rich soil, in order to increase the resulting yield, while the sparser the seeds are planted, the more ramified the grown plants will be. Conversely, for the production of textiles such as cloth sacks, sheets, or shirts, the soil does not need to be as rich, while the seeds must be more densely sowed, in order to obtain plants without branches, which are more suitable for such products. Morover, hemp fiber is described as necessary for the production of fishing nets, since it is more water resistant than flax fiber.

Furthermore, hemp seeds have been used for food for several centuries, especially by the poorer social classes, since they were inexpensive, rich in nutrients, and available even during droughts. In fact, several centuries-old Italian recipes use cannabis sativa as the main ingredient, and these recipes include:
 the Tortelli con fiori di canapaccia, described in a recipe from the 13th century;
 the Minestra di canapuccia, which is described as good for the invalids in the Registrum coquine, written around 1430 by Johannes de Bockenheim, who was a German clergyman and cook in the service of Pope Martin V;
 the Suppa fatta di semente di canepa, described by the 15th century culinary expert Maestro Martino;
 the Piatto di canapa and the Focaccia di canapa, both described in the De honesta voluptate et valetudine, written around 1465 by gastronomist Bartolomeo Sacchi.

Tales of the Hashishins

One of the earliest mentions of the use of hashish in the Italian literature can be found in Il Milione, an account of Venetian merchant and explorer Marco Polo's travels through Asia between 1271 and 1295, that was written down by Pisan romance writer Rusticiano, with whom Marco Polo shared his prison cell in the Republic of Genoa, after his capture during the War of Curzola of 1295–1299. In the travelogue, the two authors talk about the Old Man of the Mountain, in reference to Persian leader Hasan-i Sabbah, who founded the Nizari Ismaili state in 1090 after taking control of the mountain fortress of Alamut; and the Order of Assassins, of which Hasan-i Sabbah was the first Grand Master, and whose very name derives from the word hashshāshīn (i.e. hashish users). Both the drug and the Old Man were later referenced in the Decamerone, a collection of short stories written by Florentine poet and Renaissance humanist Giovanni Boccaccio in 1353.

Republic of Venice

The cultivation of industrial cannabis in Veneto dates back to at least the 13th century, as attested in an official document from the civil authorities of Montagnana, which in 1290 prohibited the drying of the processed hemp in public places, in order to protect passers-by from its foul odor. Conversely, the mass production of naval ropes, cables, and hawsers from hemp at the Venetian Arsenal commenced between 1303 and 1322, when the first corderia was established, known as the Tana hemp house. The utilized raw hemp was mainly imported through trade agreements from the Don river delta, on the Azov Sea, where the Venetians established several trading posts, whose importance is attested by the fact that the Tana hemp house most likely derived its name from Tanais, the ancient greek name for both the Don river and the Greek colony on its delta. Nevertheless, in order to maintain favorable prices and ensure steady supplies, Venice further imported hemp from Emilia, the Marches, and the Middle East, while also improving upon its domestic production.

In the Republic of Venice, industrial cannabis was a State monopoly whose price was fixed for public uses, while both its hoarding and exportation were prohibited, and its maceration and storage were strictly regulated. The strategic importance of the raw material for shipbuilding is also attested by its exemption from tariffs, as well as by several deliberations from the Venetian judiciary that were aimed at the protection and promotion of hemp cultivation in the mainland. In particular, after its expansion into the Venetian hinterland at the beginning of the 15th century, the Republic started investing in the territory of Montagnana already in 1412, with the establishment of a warehouse where the locally produced hemp would be stored, prior to its transportation to Venice. Morover, the patricians Nicolò Tron and Giovanni Moro were sent in 1455 to the districts of Montagnana and Cologna Veneta, to oversee the necessary hydraulic projects for the construction of several hemp maceration sites. As a result, public water retting sites were established in Montagnana, Este, and Cologna Veneta, while appointed magistrates were charged with monitoring the implementation of the relevant laws.

Hemp was primarily used to manufacture cordage and sails for the Venetian fleet at low costs, but it was also used for caulking ship hulls. The produced ropes would then be safely stored, thus creating strategic stockpiles that would allow the Republic to remain independent from external suppliers during wartime. These stockpiles were overseen by three magistrates, known as the Visdomini alla Tana, who were elected by the Major Council, and one of the required checks was that the ropes produced for vessels had to be made from exactly 1,098 twisted hemp strings. When needed, the rope would be taken out of storage through dedicated holes, and cut at the required size, rather than already being produced at standardized lengths, while the fiber of any leftover would be repurposed. The rope could also be sold at a lower price to foreign ships transiting at the port, thus making it competitive in the international market at the time, although sales from the Arsenal to private third parties required a specific licence issued by the authorities.

Traditional hemp rope production

The construction of the Tana hemp house was approved on 7 July 1302 by the Major Council, as part of the first enlargement of the Arsenal, in order to localize the storage of hemp and the production of ropes.

At the hemp house, the hemp fiber would arrive in large square bales, already macerated and dry, and it would be forcefully slammed against a wooden pole, equipped with metal rods, to complete the breakage of the stalk. The remaining woody fragments would then be removed using comb-like tools of different shapes for both coarser and finer combing, in preparation for the spinning phase.

The spinning mechanism consisted in a large rotating wooden wheel, placed vertically and firmly fixed to the ground, equipped with laterally protruding rods that supported a winding rope connecting the wheel to several interchangeable wooden cylinders of different dimensions, depending on the final size of the rope to be produced, which were located a few meters away. The rotating wheel would make such cylinders spin, and they could be used to either twist a twine (with a single cylinder), or intertwine three or four strings (with multiple cylinders) to produce different types of rope. Several other tools were used in order to keep the rope always tightly stretched, while also sustaining its weight along the ropewalk; to avoid hand contact with the rope during twisting; and to keep it constantly lubricated, thus preventing any damage from friction-related heat. Afterwards, the rope was soaked overnight, since the water would cause the twisted fibers to stick together, which would therefore increase the compactness of the rope. As a final touch, an iron mesh would then be used to rub the rope, in order to remove the last few remaining streaks, while a stretch of coarse rope would be rolled up and run around the rope for a final smoothing and polishing.

After the fall of the Republic of Venice in 1797, with the arrival of Napoleon, the Tana hemp house ended its centuries-old activity, to be then turned into a warehouse, while it has more recently been used as an exhibition center during the Venice Biennale since 1980. The production of ropes was instead moved to the Corte dei Cordami (i.e. Cordage Courtyard) on the island of Giudecca, where hawsers were still being twisted in open-air ropewalks, and activities continued there up until 1995. The legacy of the once thriving hemp rope industry, as well as many other related activities, is attested in the toponyms of several streets in Venice.

Kingdom of the Two Sicilies

The cultivation of hemp in southern Italy dates back to the Roman Empire, although the earliest records of its presence in the region attest that King Hiero II of Syracuse bought hemp in Gaul in the 3rd century B.C., in order to produce cordage for his vessels. Cannabis cultivation in southern Italy continued during the Middle Ages, when Emperor Frederick II promulgated the Constitutiones Augustales in 1231, which included provisions to protect populated places in the Kingdom of Sicily from the decomposition fumes emanating from the maceration basins. In particular, the provisions ordered that no one should be permitted to soak flax or hemp in water within a mile of any city or near a Castrum so that the quality of the air may not, as we have learned for certain, be corrupted by it, while anyone violating the decree would be brought to the royal court and have their macerated goods confiscated. In regard to the disposal of any waste from the retting process, the provisions also stipulate that any filth that make a stench should be thrown a quarter of a mile out of the district or into the sea or river by the persons to whom they belong, while anyone doing otherwise would have to pay the royal court as much as one augustalis, depending on the quantity of the illegal waste.

Moreover, the Miano-Agnano highway, known as Via dei Canapi (i.e. Hemp street), was constructed in order to facilitate the transport of hemp between the fields North of Naples and the maceration sites at the lake, while also avoiding population centers. Despite two temporary bans, the first one during the plague of 1656 and the second one following the death of one of the sons of Viceroy Gaspar de Bracamonte from an infection in Pozzuoli in 1663, retting activities continued in the Phlegraean Fields until the second half of the 19th century, when they became unprofitable. This land reclamation project was carried out in order to remove the rotting fumes, as well as to prevent further outbreaks of the mosquito-borne malaria by reducing the local habitat of the Anopheles mosquito.

Nevertheless, from the 17th century onwards, the hemp cultivation area in Campania steadily increased to include the southern part of the modern-day Province of Caserta, and most of the former Province of Naples, including the sides of Mt. Vesuvius. According to an economic census compiled under King Joachim-Napoleon, during the French rule of the Kingdom of Naples between 1806 and 1815, hemp fields were mainly located in the fertile Volturno river basin, between the comuni of Capua, Caserta, Maddaloni, and Aversa; while significant exports of hemp from Naples towards the rest of Europe were recorded around 1840. The legacy of the once-flourishing industry of hemp cultivation and processing in the area is attested in the toponyms of several streets and towns around Naples, while the comuni of Arzano and San Marco Evangelista even show a hemp plant in their coats of arms.

Furthermore, the oldest corderia that is still operating in Italy was established in 1796 in Castellammare di Stabia, near Naples, in order to produce high-quality cordage from hemp as part of the local shipyard, which was founded in 1773 by royal decree of King Ferdinand IV of Naples. Another noteworthy site for the production of ropes in the Kingdom of the Two Sicilies was located near the Ear of Dionysius in Syracuse, Sicily, where the wide humid spaces within the Grotta dei Cordari (i.e. Cave of the Ropemakers) have been utilized as ropewalks for three centuries, using hemp produced in Campania, until the last ropemakers left in 1984 due to the risk of collapse.

Papal States

The cultivation of hemp in what are now Umbria and the Marches was already widespread during the mid 13th century, as attested in the cartulary of the Abbey of Sassovivo, and in ancient statutes of the town of Foligno, as well as other towns in the March of Ancona. After the affirmation of Papal rule over Romagna in the early 16th century, hemp and wheat became two of the main exports of the Papal States, so much so that several regulations emanated by Pope Paul III in 1523, and later reaffirmed by Pope Sixtus V in 1586, defined the processing standards required for hemp in order for it to be exported. In fact, the exportation of raw hemp from Bologna, when it was temporarily under Papal rule, had already been forbidden by a bull from Pope Gregory XI in 1376, which aimed at allowing the inhabitants to keep the revenue derived from the processing of hemp plants. Furthermore, similarly to the regulations implemented in southern Italy, city laws sometimes dating back to 14th century statutes and subsequently updated up until the 18th century, banned maceration sites both inside and outside city walls in the areas around Foligno and Ascoli Piceno, for public health reasons based on the miasma theory; while several other laws regulated the production of hemp fiber and ropes, in order to ensure high-quality products. Notwithstanding the health-related restrictions, these activities were so widespread that the retting of hemp plants was still carried out almost everywhere, even within urban centers.

Hemp plants were used in their entirety, namely the roots were used as firewood, the woody fragments of the stalk were dipped in sulfur to produce matches, the seeds were used as food for livestock, and the fiber was used to make fishing nets, ropes to be used in various agricultural activities, and textiles such as packaging for fine linens, flour sacks, family clothing, and trousseaus for daughters' weddings. As they are particularly resistant, hemp fibers were also mixed with the more delicate wool to produce mezzalana (i.e. half-wool) fabrics, which were especially suitable for wear-prone textile products. To this day, hemp is still used in the area around Sant'Arcangelo di Romagna to produce tablecloths decorated with copper stamps in the traditional green and rust colors. Historically, hemp ropes were also widely used for the numerous architectural and engineering projects that took place in Rome, and Foligno in particular is cited by architect Domenico Fontana as a major producer of hemp fiber. As an example, Roman ropemakers used fiber from Foligno to produce the significant amount of cordage that was used to move and re-erect the Vatican Obelisk at the center of St. Peter's Square in 1586, for a total of 4,700 canne (10.5 km; 6.65 mi) of rope with an average thickness equal to a third of a palm (7.17 cm; 2.82 in).

Industrial cannabis cultivation

Another important center for cannabis production was located near Viterbo, in Lazio, in the town of Canepina, which derives its name from the once locally widespread cultivation of the plant. In particular, the lands surrounding the town are rich in water, which flowed along a multitude of streams and rivulets, while the predominantly stony grounds caused the local hemp to acquire a pure white color, which made it particularly sought-after in all contemporary markets, and especially by Roman noblewomen.

In Umbria, industrial cannabis was cultivated both in the river valleys, such as along the Nera river banks, and in the Apennine mountains, such as in Gavelli, Monteleone di Spoleto, and Castelluccio di Norcia, with the plant being able to survive elevations of  a.s.l., at the highest. Moreover, following several land reclamation projects carried out between 1561 and 1562 in the swampy areas between the comuni of Foligno, Trevi, Montefalco, and Bevagna, under Francesco Jacobilli, and in 1588 in the swamp of Colfiorito, vast sections of the newly recovered fertile farm land were turned into hemp fields, which resulted in a significant increase in the local hemp production already in 1563. Most of these reclaimed lands belonged to the Jacobilli noble family, who leased them to other noble families, and these families then subleased them to the eventual farmers, who would then grow hemp and wheat on a rotational basis, switching their crops every two or three years. The legacy of the cultivation and processing of industrial cannabis is attested in the traditional tools, toponyms, and even nursery rhymes, that can still be found in the area around Foligno.

Conversely, in the Marches, hemp fields were less common in the countryside, with the exception of the elevated valleys of the Potenza and Chienti rivers, although they steadily increased during the 18th century around Ascoli Piceno and the Tronto river valley, in order to accommodate the contemporary population and economic growths. In particular, besides the increased needs of the general population, the higher demand for hemp was also prompted by the expanding maritime trade and fishery sectors in the nearby Adriatic coast, as well as the establishment of the free port of Ancona in 1732. Moreover, another noteworthy center for the production of ropes and fishing nets in the Papal States was located in San Benedetto del Tronto, where ropemakers used hemp grown in Ferrara, Ascoli Piceno, as well as other cultivation centers in Romagna.

In the territory of Bologna, which firmly returned under Papal rule in the early 16th century, the cultivation of cannabis increased significantly between the 14th and 17th centuries, with the development of new production techniques that remained in use until the 19th century. Starting from farm lands located between the comuni of Bologna, Budrio, and Cento, the mass cultivation of cannabis spread to large parts of Emilia and Romagna, particularly around the cities of Bologna, Ferrara, Modena, Rovigo, Ravenna, and Cesena. Initially sustained by the demand for hemp fiber from the Venetian Arsenal, as well as from local customers, in the 17th century producers in Bologna started exporting hemp to shipyards in Northwestern Europe, where it was used for the manufacture of ropes and sails. The importance of hemp cultivation in the region is attested in the 1741 poem Il Canapajo, in which Ferrarese presbyter and scholar Girolamo Baruffaldi pays close attention to the agronomical aspects of its cultivation. The last boost in the local production of industrial cannabis occurred during the 19th century, particularly after 1870, with significant applications in the industrial sector.

Kingdom of Piedmont–Sardinia

The introduction of hemp plants in Piedmont is generally attributed to the arrival of Roman legions in what was then Cisalpine Gaul, in the 3rd century B.C., with the earliest cultivations being located in the area around modern-day Carmagnola, since it was rich in water without being swampy. Other sources date the introduction of hemp into the region to the 10th century, or alternatively its possible reintroduction, following the fall of the Western Roman Empire in 476 A.D., and the concurrent migration period lasting between the 4th and 6th centuries A.D., which could have disrupted its cultivation. Nevertheless, the cultivation of hemp spread to the entire Padan plain during the Middle Ages, in particular during the 11th century, while a major boost to the production of hemp in Carmagnola was given by the foundation of the Abbey of Santa Maria di Casanova, between 1127 and 1150, after a land donation made by the Marquis of Saluzzo to the Cistercians.

Several documents from the 12th and 13th centuries attest the cultivation and processing of hemp in the area, in particular with the monks working on expanding and improving their crops, which grew to cover several hectares. In the 14th century, hemp fields in Piedmont covered a large area between the comuni of Cavour, Cercenasco, La Loggia, Moretta, and Racconigi. The importance of cannabis cultivation in the region is attested in the historical area of Canavese, which reportedly derives its name from the plant, while the comuni of Barone Canavese, Borgomasino, and Prascorsano also show a hemp plant in their coats of arms. In any case, Carmagnola became an important trading center for hemp fiber and seeds under the Marquisate of Saluzzo, and by the second half of the 16th century it was the main center for all of Piedmont. In particular, the Carmagnola hemp variety was exported to the rest of the Italian states, as well as to France, and the town itself acquired over the centuries the title of Empire of Hemp.

Hemp rope production

In the 15th century, the main use of the produced fiber was in warfare, and it was mainly acquired by the Marquisate of Saluzzo, the Duchy of Savoy, the Republic of Genoa, as well as the French army. After its annexation by the Savoyard state under Duke Charles Emmanuel I of Savoy in 1588, Carmagnola became an important center for the production of hemp ropes, although this was mainly driven by artisan family businesses, while the main product being traded in the region was still the raw fiber, with significant purchases being made by Spanish, French, and Genoese merchants. Even though the rope production in Carmagnola never quite had an industrial nature, a rope factory was established in the town in 1617, in order to produce stocks of strings for the matchlocks used in arquebuses, as well as to supply hemp ropes to the Royal Sardinian Army and Navy. Despite a temporary interruption due to the plague of 1630, the production of ropes in Carmagnola significantly increased during the 17th century, as did their exportation, particularly to France; and by the 18th century, nine of the twenty provinces of the Kingdom of Piedmont produced a surplus of hemp.

According to a population census taken in 1665, 18 families of ropemakers could be found in the town, spread among its various frazioni, while 19 families were recorded in a 1734 census. The reputation of the locally-produced ropes was such that, reportedly, they were even supplied to Napoleon during his Italian campaign of 1796–1797. However, around the end of the 18th century, the number of ropemakers decreased due to some families emigrating to the territories on the other side of the Alps, where they taught their trade to the local artisans. Nevertheless, the hemp-related activities in Carmagnola reached their peak during the 19th century, with a total of 30 rope factories, which by that time were all concentrated in the frazione of San Bernardo. Moreover, among the 80 factories and workshops that could be found in Carmagnola in 1882, 66 were connected in one way or another to the processing of hemp, including 5 ropeyards, which employed generally underpaid workers. In 1886, several ropemakers even founded a mutual aid society, as well as a religious society, for which Saint Bartholomew the Apostle was chosen as the protector, since his life and martyrdom were seen as reminiscent of the maceration of hemp stalks.

After the Italian Unification of 1861, in particular with the annexation of Veneto and Friuli, then parts of the Kingdom of Lombardy–Venetia, by the Kingdom of Italy after the Third Italian War of Independence of 1866, the demand for ropes produced in Carmagnola decreased, while profits made from exports were limited by tariffs. Nevertheless, Carmagnola remained the primary center for the production of hemp seeds, which became the main source of revenue for the local economy between 1875 and 1889. However, the cultivation of hemp in Carmagnola started to decline at the beginning of the 20th century, due to a reduction in the price of bast fibre, with the crisis deepening between 1925 and 1935, and the main hemp market closing down in 1939. In 1936, the number of rope factories in the town decreased to 7, although their number increased to 11 with Italy entering World War II in 1940, and they supplied the Ministry of War, the Ministry of Communication, the State Railways, the Artillery Directorate, the arsenals of La Spezia Naval Base and others. In any case, the centuries-old activity of Carmagnola eventually came to an end around the mid-1960s, mainly due to the introduction of cheaper synthetic fibers, although its legacy is still attested in the remains of the old markets, maceration sites, and ropeyards. In particular, the last one remaining of the 40 historical tettoie (i.e. canopies), that were once used as ropewalks, has been turned into the Hemp Museum of Carmagnola, and it includes several traditional tools that are still occasionally being used for reenactments by the local Historical Society of the Ropemakers.

Kingdom of Italy

Italian hemp in the United Kingdom

The reputation of Italian hemp well preceded the unification of the country in 1861; namely, its higher quality, durability, and strength had already been noted during its first introduction into the United Kingdom in the 1820s, where it was initially used for the production of fishing nets, despite its higher price. At the time, Italian farmers were said to sow hemp on their best lands, which are rich, strong loams, on which they are at all possible pains to procure a fine friable surface, while using for manure a mixture of dung, pieces of rotten cloth, feathers, and horns, brought from Dalmatia. However, hemp could still be cultivated in all kinds of soil, resulting in fibers of different qualities; in particular, poor lands would produce finer fibers, although in smaller quantities, whereas rich lands would produce coarser fibers in greater quantities, and the latter was the one required for the manufacture of cables, hawsers, and other heavy rigging.

As an example of the quality of the hemp produced in Italy, a smack-owner from Barking, Essex, who combined Russian and Italian twines for his fishing net, reported that the Russian hemp portion had to be renewed with the same material several times before the Italian hemp portion was worn out. Moreover, tensile tests performed at the Chatham Dockyard in January 1855 found the strength of Italian hemp to be nearly one-fourth higher than that of Russian hemp. Furthermore, following a Navy Board inspection of the Chatham and Portsmouth ropeyards on 4 November 1823, a more extended use of Italian hemp was recommended, particularly for lines and twines, in order to counter the monopoly that Russia held in the country at the time, while it was reckoned that the higher cost of the fiber would be recouped by its longer duration.

Therefore, it was reckoned that Great Britain could not provide for the immense demand from both the Royal Navy and the Merchant Navy by relying solely on its own production, hence the need for imports. In fact, even though at the time industrial hemp was cultivated in various parts of France, Spain, Holland, Denmark, Sweden, and in several of the Italian states; none of these countries, with the exception of a trifling export from Italy, produced it in enough quantities to satisfy their respective internal demands, while Russia was considered to be the grand mart for hemp as an article of commerce.

The strategic importance of ensuring the steady supply of raw hemp became even more evident during the Crimean War of 1853–1856, which prompted a discussion on possible alternative suppliers of fibers among the British colonies and dominions, such as the Cape Colony and British India. In fact, the potential introduction of both Italian hemp and rhea into the Indian subcontinent, together with proper processing machinery, was proposed as a way for the United Kingdom to become independent from the rest of the world in terms of supplies. In the 1850s, the Italian hemp was selling at £70 per long ton in the London market, which was more than double the price for the best Russian hemp, and would roughly correspond to £8,800 (€10,000; 11,200 US$) per long ton in 2019.

Italian hemp and oceanography

Hemp fiber produced in Italy has been used for several geographical surveys and scientific explorations, such as the sounding of the deep sea bed off the coast of Ireland by the HMS Porcupine in 1869; and the Challenger expedition of 1872–1876, in which the HMS Challenger carried  of Italian hemp rope that was used for measuring the depths of the ocean through plummets, as well as lowering dredges in order to sample the sea floor. Even though the sounding lines were usually well hackled and rubbed down, in order to prevent any ragged parts from projecting outward and thus increasing the friction of the cordage during its descent, the submerged ropes would have still been increasingly slowed down the more they descended by the air bubbles trapped in their interstices, thus significantly distorting the measurements at great depths.

Most notably, after running out of rope during the first reading, the expedition measured on 23 March 1875 a depth of  near what would later become known as the Challenger Deep, at the southern end of the Mariana Trench, thus unexpectedly discovering what was at the time the deepest ever recorded point of the ocean floor. In any case, since the weights attached to the hemp lines were too heavy for the limited steam power available on board, which was mainly used either to power the dredging platform or to keep the ship from drifting during depth soundings, such plummets were slipped and left at the bottom of the sea after each measurement.

At the same time, the SMS Gazelle was sent by the Imperial German Navy in 1874 on a two-year voyage, charged with carrying to the Kerguelen Islands one of the several German scientific expeditions that were sent to different sites around the world, in order to observe the transit of Venus on 9 December 1874; as well as with promoting oceanography and conducting physical and oceanographic research in the maritime sciences. Despite having an estimated breaking load of  when dry and  when wet, these lines never broke during the voyage and they were used exclusively for deep-sea explorations.

Italian hemp and mountaineering

During the golden age of alpinism, the strength of Italian hemp was also noticed in the context of the development of protection systems for rock climbing and mountaineering. In 1864, a special committee of the Alpine Club approved the use of ropes made from Manila hemp, Italian hemp, and flax for mountaineering purposes. The aim of the committee was to determine what is the strongest kind of rope which is light enough to be carried about, considering that the alpine traveller's rope, if tried at all, will have to resist a sudden jerk, which may be a very violent one.

In regard to their extensibility, no rope with a potential extension lower than 12.5% was considered fit for use in mountaineering, and most Manila ropes were found to extend between 15% and 16% when dry, while the Italian hemp ropes extended somewhat less. Finally, among the identified advantages in using Italian hemp, the committee found that the rope was both harder and less bulky with respect to the other two, and therefore it was reckoned that it would probably wear best, while being the least likely to cut against rocks. On the other hand, among the disadvantages, it was also found that Italian hemp ropes were much more stiff and difficult to untie than the others, and that they were very difficult to handle when wet, as they tended to kink. Nevertheless, any kind of waterproofing was reported to be highly damaging to both hemp and flax; moreover, every knot tied along the ropes was found to cumulatively weaken them and thus constituted a potential breaking point, so much so that none of the approved ropes types could pass the second one of the two previously mentioned tensile tests, if they presented a knot.

Italian hemp ropes were also used during Wiessner's ill-fated American Karakoram expedition of 1939, which unsuccessfully attempted the first ascent to the then unclimbed summit of K2. Considered to be the best ones available at the time, even though they were only half as strong as the kernmantle ropes that would become available a few years later, the Italian hemp ropes still had the disadvantage of being water absorbent and proved to be totally unmanageable when wet and frozen.

Medical use of cannabis

In the late modern period, the spread of the use of cannabis for recreational purposes in Europe is generally attributed to the return of French soldiers from Napoleon's military campaigns of 1798–1801 in Egypt, where the lack of alcohol prompted them to try hashish as an alternative. Nevertheless, the first scientific studies on the medical use of cannabis were carried out by Irish doctor William Brooke O'Shaughnessy in 1839, when he administered cannabis-based medicine to patients suffering from various diseases, ranging from epilepsy to rheumatism, and noticed an anticonvulsant, analgesic, and antiemetic efficacy.

One of the earliest attempts to treat patients with cannabis indica in Italy was made in 1887 by Dr. Raffaele Valieri, the then chief physician at the Hospital for the Incurables in Naples, which was dedicated to the treatment of patients in conditions of extreme poverty. In particular, the hospital operated in the context of four major outbreaks of cholera, which ravaged the city in 1855, in 1866, in 1873, and in 1884, causing thousands of deaths due to the severe overcrowding of the poorer neighborhoods combined with an underdeveloped sewage system, and thus prompted several major redevelopment projects in 1885. Nevertheless, Dr. Valieri spent years experimenting with the medical use of cannabis for treating nervous conditions both on patients and on himself, testing different administration methods, while also taking notes on both positive and adverse effects.

The tested administration methods included mastication, smoking pipes and cigarettes, decoctions and infuses, liquors, distilled water, pills, pearls, essential oils, tinctures and extracts. According to his findings, medical cannabis proved to be helpful in the treatment of hysteria, asthma, pulmonary emphysema, migraine, exophthalmic goiter, facial hyperkinesia, as well as other neuroses originating from both the central and peripheral nervous systems, neuralgia of the peripheral nerves, the trigeminal nerves, the occipital cervical plexus, the brachial plexus, the lumbar plexus, and the sacral plexus. Based on the observed beneficial properties of medical cannabis, and considering its popularity especially among patients with asthma, Dr. Valieri started lobbying the Health authorities so that they would reduce the cost of cannabis, in order to make it more affordable for patients. Furthermore, the doctor campaigned for the establishment of an inhalation room in all of the Local Health Agencies, similar to the one he established in his hospital, in which patients could inhale the air-filling smoke produced by the combustion of cannabis.

The main setback for the spread of medical cannabis in Italy was that, while by the end of the 19th century its use in clinical practice was well established in several parts of the world, the popular Indian variety was difficult to find in the Italian market. For this reason, Dr. Valieri tested the medical properties of several Italian varieties found in Casoria noting that, while the effects were the same as the ones experienced with cannabis indica, they required a doubling of the previously prescribed dose. Nevertheless, the medical use of cannabis suffered a significant global decline during the 20th century due to several factors, including the introduction of more effective treatments for various ailments; its pharmacological instability, derived by the fact that the active principle (THC) had not yet been isolated, and therefore its effects were difficult to predict and standardize; and the economic costs associated with importing the medicine from abroad, especially in the context of two world wars.

Early drug proibition

In the early stages of the international cannabis prohibition, the United States did not play a leading role at all, while the role of Italy, South Africa, Egypt, and Turkey is seen as largely overlooked. At the First International Opium Conference, held in the Hague in 1911–1912, Italy lobbied for an international ban on cannabis, largely due to the prevalence of the use of hashish in its North African colonies of Tripolitania and Cyrenaica, which were annexed from the Ottoman Empire after the Italo-Turkish War of 1911–1912. Even though the 1912 Conference was focused on opium, leading to the first International Opium Convention, the so-called issue of Indian hemp was examined, however nothing substantial came out of it. Instead, the regulation of cannabis came with the Second International Opium Conference, held in Geneva in 1925, at the behest of Egypt, and previous encouragements from South Africa and Italy, among others.

The section of the 1925 Opium Convention dealing with cannabis represented a compromise, in which the signatories were committed to limit exclusively to medical and scientific purposes the manufacture, import, sale, distribution, export and use of extracts and tinctures of Indian hemp. The compromise did not constitute an absolute prohibition, since it only dealt with the international trade of cannabis, while it neither prohibited its production, imposed controls on domestic traffic or consumption, nor mandated government production estimates.

The final document changed the language that was used in the proposed first draft, which incurred the objections of countries like India, where weaker cannabis-based preparations often accompanied social events, religious ceremonies, and festivals, even though the more potent hashish was generally frowned upon. In regard to the matter, the United Kingdom remained ambivalent, while the United States remained focused on opium.

Italian hemp trade

In 1914, the United States Department of Agriculture (USDA) compiled a report on the worldwide production of hemp, citing Italy as one of the main producer of hemp fiber for export, together with Russia, Hungary, and Romania. More specifically, the yearly average estimates for the five years between 1909 and 1913 reported  of farm land in Italy being occupied by hemp fields, producing 83,500 t of hemp fiber, compared to a yearly worldwide production ranging between 500,000 and 800,000 t. Although not as important as silk, as far as the textile industry was concerned, hemp was one of the few raw textile materials that Italy exported, considering that the country was at the time the second-biggest producer in Europe, after Russia. In fact, this even led to an overproduction crisis in 1921, which caused the prices of hemp to fall heavily, and the cultivation area to significantly shrink for the following two years.

As an average, the hemp fiber produced in Italy was exported at a rate of 50% of production, together with a considerable amount of tow, and the main importers of Italian hemp were Germany, England, France, Belgium, the Netherlands, and the United States. 
The quality of Italian hemp was highly appreciated, especially due to the excellent manner in which it is handled during the extraction of the fiber by the highly skilled rural labor trained in this task. Nevertheless, the exports of raw hemp declined substantially during the 1930s with respect to the previous decade, mainly due to the increase in the internal demand, whose purpose was to reduce cotton imports by replacing them with mixtures of hemp and other fibers. At the time, the main importer of Italian hemp by far was Germany, which acquired over 70% of the exports, followed by France and the United Kingdom.

In any case, the 1914 USDA report described the Italian hemp as the highest-priced hemp fiber in both the American and European markets, noting that it was obtained from plants that were similar to those cultivated in Kentucky at the time. The cause of the higher price was attributed to the process of water retting, as well as to the increased care and labor involved in the preparation of the fiber. This made the water-retted Italian hemp less competitive against the dew-retted American hemp, whose main competitors at the time were the dew-retted Russian and Hungarian hemp. Nevertheless, its different qualities made it more suitable for use in certain kinds of twines, as well as the finer grades of carpet warp, for which the American hemp was not well suited. Moreover, by the end of the 19th century, at a time when both warships and merchant vessels were transitioning from sailing ships to steamships, Russian hemp ropes of the best quality were more extensively used by the US Navy than any other rope type. Conversely, Italian hemp was only used in the navy for packing for engines, since its price at the time was more than double that of Russian hemp. Nonetheless, the Italian hemp was considered the best one among those imported into the American market at the time, so much so that the more careful cultivation and processing practices utilized in Italy, as well as France, were proposed as reference for those American growers wishing to improve their products from the cheaper, less sought-after, dark hemp to the higher-priced light hemp, and thus compete with the imported goods.

In regard to hemp seeds, they were primarily used in Italy for planting new crops, but they were also exported, especially the Carmagnola variety. However, in case of short supplies, such as during the shortage that occurred in 1924 as a consequence of the aforementioned significant reductions in the cultivation area in 1922 and 1923, hemp seeds could also be imported from abroad. In the case of the 1924 shortage, hemp seeds were imported from Manchuria, although they were considered of low quality, which was seen as an opportunity for American exporters to promote their seeds as a high-quality alternative. In particular, American exporters were advised to provide guarantees, such as the year in which the seeds were gathered and the assured germination percentage, since it was more or less customary for Italian farmers to delay payment until after germination, and to seek either a discount or a rebate in proportion to the difference between the percentage of germinating seeds and the initial guarantee.

Industrial hemp cultivation

The plentiful home supply of good raw hemp, combined with comparatively cheap labor, generally gave the Italian hemp industry a competitive advantage in the international market of the 1920s. However, the significant costs associated with the utilized machinery, combined with the somewhat limited domestic demand for hemp textiles, made the industry dependent on its foreign customers for disposing of its products, mostly in the form of raw hemp and tow. According to contemporary analyses, the improvements needed by the Italian hemp industry at the time included a more careful selection of the planted seeds; using the plant residues to manufacture cellulose instead of burning it; mechanizing the process of separating the fiber from the plant; as well as enhancing both the existing agricultural methods and the techniques used in the domestic textile industry, in order to make hemp textile preferable to linen and cotton.

In terms of the contemporary working conditions, the wages of Italian farmers in 1920 could range between the equivalents of 10 to 12 US¢/h (i.e. 1.28 to 1.53 US$/h in 2019) for heavy summer work (e.g. harvesting, threshing, and gathering hemp), around 7 US¢/h (i.e. 0.89 US$/h in 2019) for lighter summer work, and a minimum of 5 US¢/h (i.e. 0.64 US$/h in 2019) in winter. Working hours were fixed at a maximum of eight in the summer, while overtime was exceptional and paid at a rate between 25% and 50% above the normal wage, and in no case could the work day exceed ten hours. In many parts of the country, the use of machinery was allowed only on condition of full employment of all available labor, including women, while workers had to be hired exclusively through a labor exchange, on which both employers and laborers were represented. Moreover, joint municipal commissions determined the minimum number of hands to be employed on each farm, with some districts requiring landowners to commit to steadily employ one person for every , while also giving precedence to union labor. Joint commissions of employers and laborers were also appointed in order to verify that the work was fairly distributed between permanent and casual labor, with agreements stipulating that the use of machinery had to cease when unemployment was prevalent in a certain area.

In terms of the grown crops, the 1914 USDA report identified four main varieties of hemp being cultivated in Italy:
 the Bologna, (a.k.a. great hemp or chanvre de Piedmont in France), was cultivated in the provinces of Bologna, Ferrara, and Modena in Emilia-Romagna, and Rovigo in Veneto. Nevertheless, it was recommended in the USDA report as one of the most promising varieties for introduction in the United States, in small quantities, for the purpose of improving the Kentucky hemp by means of cross-fertilisation and selection.
 the Neapolitan, small seeded variety, was cultivated in the same area of the large seeded variety, with plants rarely exceeding  in height in the test sites.

In the 1940s, Italy was believed to be the second-biggest producer of industrial cannabis in the world, after the Soviet Union, although statistics from China, another major producer, are not available. According to the national farmers association Coldiretti, almost  of farm land in Italy were dedicated to the production of cannabis at the time. In addition to the areas mentioned in the 1914 USDA report, other noteworthy centers for hemp cultivation were located in Frattamaggiore and Aversa in Campania, and Carmagnola in Piedmont.

Hemp fiber production

The hemp plants were harvested between the end of July and the beginning of August, either manually or mechanically, after which the stalks were left on the ground to dry, to be then bundled together, stacked into large rafts, weighed down using heavy stones, and immersed into open-air tanks filled with soft water. The initial water retting usually lasted for eight days, after which the sheaves were taken out and dried, and then returned to the tanks for a second slightly longer retting, resulting in a soft white fiber. In the retting tanks, specific bacteria (e.g. Bacillus felsineus) processed the stalks while being kept at the best conditions in terms of temperature and air supply. The retting lasted until the bark, which includes the fiber, readily separated from the stalk, after which the process was interrupted before other bacteria could attack the fiber. After water retting, the inner woody shell of the barks was broken into pieces and removed using either manual tools or movable breaking-and-scutching machines, thus leaving just the clean, long, and straight fiber.

Besides the need of deep, soft, moist, and deeply worked soil that is rich in organic matter, several other factors were identified that could affect both the quality and the quantity of the produced hemp fiber:
 During the sowing, in March, farmers had to take into account the quality of the soil, the amount of fertilizer used, and the desired fiber qualities. In particular, densely planted seeds would produce taller and less-ramified plants, resulting in a long, fine, and delicate fiber, while sparser seeds would produce a coarser and more resistant one.
 During the harvest, between the end of July and the beginning of August, the maturity of the hemp plants had to be carefully assessed, since a difference of a few days could have significant effects. In particular, a premature harvest would produce a paler, less resistant fiber, and also in smaller quantities, while a late harvest would return a thicker, darker, rougher fiber, which was also more labor-intensive to extract.
 During the water retting, farmers used their experience and knowledge to determine its duration, which ranged between four and ten days, depending on factors like the water temperature and quality, as well as the particular hemp variety used. Moreover, the quality of the water within the open-air retting tanks was greatly affected by adverse weather, as well as the consecutive rettings of multiple stocks. Furthermore, the possible mishandling of the hemp stalks during this difficult process could also damage the fiber.
 After the retting, the numerous sheaves were each untied at one end and the stalks were then left to dry in the open in cone-shaped stacks. In case of fair weather, the hemp would acquire a good, bright color between blond and light silver, while rain would prevent the hemp from properly drying, and make it lose color and brightness. Moreover, the mud at the feet of the stalks would cause irregular hues, while the dripping rainwater would affect the divisibility of the fiber, and therefore its fineness, elasticity, and spinability. These risks were significant, since the twice or thrice-repeated retting could extend the process to a few weeks, thus increasing the probability of bad weather.

In some locations the retting process was done using running water, still the tanks had to be located far away from population centers, due to the strong odors produced by the maceration of the hemp plants. Nevertheless, the tanks were usually filled up in mid-July through dedicated aqueducts, and could also be used for fish farming, while they were drained again during winter, in order to remove the sediments and stones that deposited at the bottom during their use. As the water was being pumped out, a significant number of goldfishes, which proliferated inside the tanks during the retting season, was easily caught by hand, and then sorted based on their size, variety, and color, in order to ultimately be sold as pet fish.

Republic of Italy

The decline of hemp production in Italy came with the economic boom of the 1950s and 1960s, during which time synthetic fibers (e.g. nylon) were introduced into the market and the international campaign against narcotics intensified. In particular, industrial cannabis almost completely disappeared from most Western European countries by the end of the 1960s, with France and Spain being the only two countries which basically never interrupted the cultivation of hemp, although they still had significantly different and volatile trends.

This significant decline is mainly attributed to competition from both industrial fabrics and cotton for textiles, metallic materials for naval ropes, as well as Manila and jute for packaging during long sea voyages. Other contributing factors include a tightening of regulations for textile hemp, increases in the cost of labor that could not be easily replaced by mechanization, and the significant environmental impact of the retting tanks. Furthermore, in regard to drug prohibition, Italy endorsed all the three major drug control treaties, namely the Single Convention on Narcotic Drugs of 1961, the Convention on Psychotropic Substances of 1971, and the United Nations Convention Against Illicit Traffic in Narcotic Drugs and Psychotropic Substances of 1988, and soon after the passage of the anti-drug Cossiga Law 685/75 of 1975, hemp fields in Italy all but disappeared.

Hemp farming techniques

In the 1950s, the cultivation of hemp in Italy was concentrated in the traditional areas of Emilia, Polesine, and Campania. Prior to sowing, the soil enrichment was completed with a significant amount of chemical fertilizers, which could vary from the traditional simple mixtures of mineral superphosphate, ammonium sulfate, and potassium sulfate; to the more complex substances including the NPK fertilizers 11-22-16 and 06-12-09, PK fertilizers, and diammonium phosphate. Beside soil enrichment, farmers also used aldrin to kill off all ground-based insects that could harm the crops, especially during their early stages, including elateridae, cockchafer larvae, agrotis larvae, and field crickets. The manually-spread fertilizers and insecticides were both buried into the soil through dedicated tilling machines, which would also soften the earth in preparation for the sowing.

The fast growth of the hemp plants to their maximum height was also encouraged by the densely planted seeds, which would prompt the individual plants to fiercely compete for sunlight.

The main pest for the hemp plants was the european corn borer, whose larvae would penetrate the stalks during the months of April and May, in order to develop within the medullary channel. This process would cause severe internal damage to the crops, especially following the imaginal stage, with the ruined stalks being easily broken by the wind. In order to stop the development of these pests, farmers used to spray the hemp crops with a mixture of DDT-based insecticides, water, and organophosphorus compounds.

Hemp production decline

In the 1950s, while the Soviet Union remained the biggest producer of hemp in the world, Italy was overtaken by India in the second place, and then by Yugoslavia in the third place. The production of hemp in Asia in general, and India in particular, did not yet show significant oscillations since switching to more profitable crops was not yet feasible. Similarly, in Yugoslavia and Eastern Europe (e.g. Poland, Hungary, and Romania) the production trends remained more or less stationary, in part due to labor costs not yet being a limiting factor, and thus the produced hemp constituted significant competition. Nevertheless, the total cultivation area in Europe was ever-shrinking, namely declining by 45.3% between 1961 and 1973, with the regional reduction peaking at 97.3% in Italy.

Global exports of hemp fiber were also declining, namely dropping by 46% from an average of 70,000 t between 1948 and 1952, to 38,000 t in 1958. In particular, Italy was the biggest exporter between 1948 and 1952 with 22,000 t of fiber and 9,000 t of tow, followed by India with 22,000 t of fiber, and then by Yugoslavia with 5,000 t of fiber and 7,000 t of tow; however, India was the biggest exporter in 1958 with 11,200 t of fiber, followed by Yugoslavia with 10,600 t, and then by Italy with 10,300 t. The main importers of Italian hemp were West Germany, Switzerland, Czechoslovakia, France, Austria, and the United Kingdom, while Italy started importing hemp mainly from Yugoslavia and India.

In 1973, Italy was the biggest importer with 8,238 t, which accounted for 25.8% of the global demand, while no significant export was reported, considering that the total cultivation area was reduced to just , producing 300 t of fiber. The decline of hemp production in Italy was more pronounced in the North, while it was slower in the South, but it was nevertheless irreversible. In particular, Campania accounted for 77% of the national cultivation area in 1958, followed at a significant distance by Emilia-Romagna and Piedmont, with the latter being noteworthy primarily for the production of hemp seeds rather than fiber. The cultivation of hemp was prohibited in Italy by 1980, with the exception of very few and strictly controlled cases, which caused the germplasm of some old Italian varieties to be lost, and the development of new machinery for the cultivation and processing of hemp to be abandoned. In 1991, Italy was still reported as the biggest importer of hemp, while the national production completely ceased by that time.

Drug prohibition

The Law 685/75 introduced the concept of modest quantity in order to distinguish those who merely consume drugs from those who push them, with the latter being the ones whom the law was supposed to punish, while previously no such distinction was made. Nevertheless, with the lack of a specific definition for what constitutes a modest quantity of a certain drug, the matter was left to the discretion of the judges, and thus the Supreme Court of Cassation presented guidelines so that judges would reach consistent verdicts. In particular, the guidelines established that a modest quantity did not necessarily refer to a particular quantity of narcotics and that, before reaching a verdict, a court had to clarify the level of drug dependence of the defendant, and to scientifically establish the nature and composition of the confiscated drugs, as well as the average quantity of active principles that could be obtained from them. However, the so-called Iervolino-Vassalli Law, which was included in the Presidential Decree DPR 309/90 of 1990, substituted the concept of modest quantity with the one of average daily dose, where the maximum quantities that could be legally consumed were defined for each drug by Ministerial Decree.

In the context of the DPR 309/90, a mere drug abuser is considered to be a patient in need of rehabilitation, and therefore not subjected to penal system, but they can still be subjected to administrative penalties. Such penalties include the suspension of their driver's licence, gun licence, and passport, for a period of at least one month and at most one year. Nevertheless, the Radical Party led by Marco Pannella successfully campaigned for a referendum that repealed criminal penalties for the personal use of soft drugs in 1993, and thus the concept of average daily dose was eliminated, while the judicial discretion on a case-by-case basis was re-established.

In 2006, the controversial Fini-Giovanardi Law 49/06 removed the distinction between hard and soft drugs, and thus made the possession of marijuana and hashish punishable as harshly as the possession of heroin or cocaine, until it was eventually struck down by the Constitutional Court in 2014. The decision to rule the Law 49/06 unconstitutional was based not on its content, but rather on the way the initial bill was passed into law, since it had been attached to a measure that covered a wide range of issues. In any case, the Law 49/06 tripled sentences for selling, cultivating, and possessing cannabis from 2–6 years to 6–20 years, thus leading to prison overcrowding, with 40% of inmates being jailed for drug-related crimes, although cannabis consumption was never criminalized. Furthermore, the Law 49/06 introduced the criterion of quantifying the amount of active principle within the confiscated drugs, as well as a zero-tolerance policy regarding behaviors and circumstances which could indicate drug trafficking. As a consequence, a crime would be committed if the quantity of active principle was above the limits set by the Ministerial Table, which for cannabis was established at 500 mg, corresponding to a gross weight of about 5 g, or about 15-20 joints.

Since 2014, the main legislation regarding narcotics is the Lorenzin Decree-Law 36/14, which establishes five Tables of Substances published by the Ministry of Health. The various controlled substances are included in their respective tables based on their assessed harmfulness, and cannabis is currently placed in the second one, along with its derivatives. Therefore, certain legal sanctions regarding the trade and consumption of cannabis are maintained, although they are less harsh than they were before. In particular, the possession of cannabis for personal use is currently decriminalized and subjected to fines and the confiscation of personal documents like passports and driver's licenses, while its unlicensed cultivation and sale are still illegal, and punishable with a prison sentence between 2 and 6 years, as well as a fine between €26,000 (29,000 US$) and €260,000 (290,000 US$).

EU regulations and incentives

In particular, in 1994 and 1995, the only cannabis plants officially cultivated in Italy were the ones grown at the State research agency ENEA, under the strict control of the authorities, while research projects that were started in Emilia and Aosta Valley for educational purposes had been shut down.

Furthermore, following the cessation of hemp production in Italy, concerns were raised in the European Parliament in 1998, over the recovery and protection of the remaining endangered Italian varieties, as well as the potentially permanent loss of the biodiversity and economic benefits previously derived from the cultivation of hemp. The subsequent response from the European Commission referred to Council Regulation (EC) 1467/94 of 20 June 1994, whose objectives are to help ensure and improve the conservation, characterisation, documentation, evaluation and utilisation of potentially valuable plant and animal genetic resources in the Community. At the same time, Italy started a program that aimed at the reintroduction of the cultivation of hemp in the country, by issuing yearly permits for hemp fields covering , although it initially received mixed results due to the underperforming commercial utilisation.

Nevertheless, further interest in hemp was prompted by Council Regulation (EC) 1251/99 of 17 May 1999, and subsequent implementing regulations, which established a support scheme for farmers growing specific arable crops, from a list that included industrial hemp. In particular, with the enlargement of the EU toward the countries of Eastern Europe, the Union became 3rd in the world in terms of hemp cultivation area, after China and Canada. At present, France is the largest hemp producer in Europe, accounting for more than 70% of the EU production, followed by the Netherlands at 10%, and Austria at 4%.

In regard to Italy, among the problems faced by Italian farmers at the time was the difficulty in finding the appropriate hemp varieties and growing techniques for the local terrains, considering that the almost complete disappearance of the old Italian varieties prompted the farmers to rely on seeds imported from France. Moreover, in order to qualify for EU grants, the grown plants needed to have a THC content at most equal to 0.2%, which could be difficult to achieve, especially when the plants are allowed to grow until the seeding stage. Furthermore, in order to make the operation commercially viable, farmers and technicians had to determine the properties of the different sections of the hemp plants; develop effective mechanical processes to clean and separate the various parts of the stem; and assess the quality of the produced fiber, when compared to the readily available French varieties, especially in regard to their most valuable applications in the textile market.

In 2014, Italian hemp varieties were tested as potential candidates for the possible reintroduction of hemp in the United States, after all existing American varieties were eradicated as a consequence of the War on Drugs. The research was conducted at the Agricultural Experiment Station of the University of Kentucky, as well as several university-affiliated privately-owned test sites within the State, after the then Kentucky Agriculture Commissioner James Comer negotiated the release of a shipment of Italian hemp seeds, that had been confiscated by the DEA in Louisville.

Recent developments

The production of cannabis for both medical and industrial purposes has seen a resurgence in Italy in recent years, as a consequence of the aforementioned EU regulations, and the development of new technologies and innovative applications involving cannabis plants. In fact, said regulations are specifically referenced in the cannabis light Law 242/16 of 2016, of which one of the stated aims is the support and promotion of the hemp sector (Cannabis sativa L.) as a crop capable of reducing environmental impact in agriculture, reducing land consumption and desertifcation and loss of biodiversity, and as a crop to be used as a possible substitute for surplus crops and as a rotational crop.

The national hemp cultivation area involves more than 800 farms, mainly spread between the Regions of Tuscany, Piedmont, Veneto, Sicily, Apulia, Emilia-Romagna, Basilicata, Abruzzo, and Sardinia. The certified seeds used for sowing can come from Italian Hemp Associations and Cooperatives, such as Tecnocanapa, Assocanapa, and Federcanapa; as well as from abroad, particularly Germany, France, and the general area of Northeastern Europe. In regard to possible future expansions, it is estimated that with the potential redevelopment of already-existing greenhouses, which either fell into disuse or were abandoned due to the crisis of the horti-floriculture sector, Italy would have ready access to a further  of farm land for the production of medical cannabis within secure environments.

In terms of imports of industrial cannabis, Italy reported in 2017 a total of 8 t of seeds for sowing, 884 t of seeds for other uses, and 0.3 t of fiber, while the reported numbers for 2018 were equal to 46, 557, and 11 t, respectively. Such imports were mainly from Canada, France, the Netherlands, Germany, and China. According to an analysis by the Observatory of Economic Complexity, Italy was the 5th largest importer of hemp fibers in the world in 2020, although the goods were just the 1,104th most imported product of the country. Moreover, the main import markets for Italy were Spain, Netherlands, Luxembourg, Austria, and Switzerland, of which Netherlands, Spain, and Austria were the fastest growing between 2019 and 2020; while the main importing competitors for Italy in 2020 were Spain, Germany, and Switzerland. In terms of exports, Italy was the 4th largest exporter of hemp fibers in the world in 2020, even though the goods were just the 1,033rd most exported product of the country. Furthermore, the main export markets for Italian hemp are Switzerland, France, Luxembourg, Spain, and the United Kingdom, the first three of which were the fastest growing ones between 2019 and 2020; while the main exporting competitors for Italy in 2020 were France, the Netherlands, and the United States.

In regard to publicity programs, the Canapa Mundi International Hemp Expo was established in 2015, based on an idea from its founder and pioneer of the modern Italian hemp market Gennaro Maulucci, and it is officially recognized by the Region of Lazio as an International Fair. In the last few years, the annual event has been held at the Fiera di Roma exhibition center in Rome, with the attendance of as many as 30,000 visitors, as well as several hundreds of both national and international entities, including research institutes, private companies, and universities. Besides providing exposure of the cannabis and hemp sectors to the wider public, the exhibition also aims at supporting the companies that work in these fields, with a list of addressed topics that include biodiversity, sustainability, food, wellness, textiles, constructions, culture, and innovation.

Legalization efforts

In 2012, a study was published regarding the trace presence of psychotropic substances such as cocaine, cannabinoids, nicotine, and caffeine, in the air of eight major Italian cities, namely Palermo, Turin, Rome, Bologna, Florence, Milan, Naples, and Verona. The analysis of a year's worth of atmospheric data revealed what appears to be a seasonal trend in the consumption of cannabinoids, with measurements consistently peaking during winter in all eight locations, while all but disappearing during the warmer period between May and August. Moreover, higher-than-average levels of cannabinoids were measured in both Bologna and Florence, and these were mainly attributed to student culture, considering that the two relatively close historic cities are both major academic hubs that attract a large number of international students every year, especially when compared with their respective small populations, both numbering between 300,000 and 400,000 residents.

In regard to public opinion, according to a 2015 poll by Ipsos, 83% of Italians deem laws prohibiting soft drugs as ineffective, 73% are in favour of legal cannabis, and 58% think that legalization would benefit public finances. In terms of consumption rates, 25% of people aged 15 to 19 years old reported using cannabis for recreational purposes at least once in 2014. Moreover, according to a 2018 report by the European Monitoring Centre for Drugs and Drug Addiction, Italy ranks 3rd in the European Union in terms of cannabis use.

2016 political debate

The popularity of recreational cannabis led in 2016 to renewed legalization efforts in Parliament, where legislation was proposed with the support of several politicians, mainly from the centre-left Democratic Party, the left-wing Left Ecology Freedom party, the anti-establishment Five Star Movement, the anti-prohibition Radical Party, and even a few from the conservative Forza Italia party, as well as members of the Anti-Mafia Directorate. Proponents of the legislation pointed at the failure of prohibitionism in reducing cannabis consumption and argued that legalizing cannabis would regulate the circulation of cannabis-related products, reduce consumption among adolescents, allow the police and courts to focus their resources on other issues, and deprive criminal organizations of a significant source of revenue by redirecting it toward the State in the form of taxes, similarly to what happened in Colorado after it legalized cannabis in 2012. In particular, the value of the illegal cannabis market in Italy is estimated between 7.2 billion and more than 30 billion euros, while the potential tax revenue from legal cannabis is estimated between 5.5 and 8.5 billion euros. Moreover, the potential GDP boost resulting from a legal cannabis market in Italy is estimated between 1.30% and 2.34%.

Nevertheless, legalization efforts were opposed by several conservative and catholic-leaning politicians, mainly from the Northern League party and the New Centre-Right party, who argued that the consumption of cannabis constitutes a health risk and that legalization will not reduce drug addiction. The PD-led coalition government at the time, which included the New Centre-Right, was mainly focused on ensuring the passage of constititutional reforms, therefore cannabis legalization was not considered a priority. After the defeat of the constitutional referendum and the subsequent resignation of then Prime Minister Matteo Renzi on 12 December 2016, legalization efforts stalled in Parliament.

Cannabis light

In 2016, the cannabis light Law 242/16 removed the need for authorization to plant certified cannabis seeds with levels of THC below 0.2%, while the detection of THC levels between 0.2% and 0.6% during field inspections is still considered acceptable, when it can be attributed to natural causes. The law also requires farmers to keep the certification receipts for up to one year, while also prohibiting them to plants the hemp seeds produced with a previous crop, as well as to use the cannabis leaves and inflorescences for edible products. The State Forestry Department is in charge of checking that farmers are complying with the established legal framework, as indicated by European regulations, although other State entities can carry out inspections if it is deemed necessary.

The potential revenue from the sale of cannabis light in Italy was estimated to be more than 40 million euros, and by 2018 hundreds of new businesses started growing cannabis in several Regions. Even though these looser requirements were originally intended to benefit farmers growing industrial hemp, with the production being limited to the 75 varieties of industrial hemp certified by the European Union, a lack of clarity regarding the use of cannabis inflorescences effectively created a booming unregulated market for recreational light cannabis. In particular, approximately 1,300 light cannabis shops, delivery services, and vending machines have sprung up in Italy, selling hemp inflorescences and leaves as collector's item. In fact, since the law does not explicitly prohibit the sale of hemp flowers, customers can legally buy them, and then they can simply crumble them, roll them, and smoke them. The aforementioned 0.2% limit for the allowed THC content is considerably lower than the 15-25% range typically found in marijuana, thus preventing cannabis light users from actually getting stoned, however proponents of cannabis legalization are confident that the spread of cannabis light can contribute to the normalization of cannabis overall.

Nevertheless, in September 2018, then Interior Minister and Northern League party leader Matteo Salvini issued a memo to law enforcement agencies outlining a zero-tolerance policy towards cannabis retailers. In particular, the directive stated that cannabis products that contain THC levels above 0.2%, or that are made from plants not included in the official list of industrial hemp varieties, must be considered as narcotics and thus confiscated. Moreover, the Superior Council of Health, which provides technical-scientific counsel to the Ministry of Health, recommended in April 2018 to stop the free sale of cannabis light, as a public health precaution. The Council argued that the industrial applications of cannabis, as envisaged in the Law 242/16, do not include cannabis inflorescences; and they also cited a lack of scientific studies on the effects of even small levels of THC on possibly vulnerable subjects such as older people, breastfeeding mothers, and patients with certain pathologies, which prevents them form ruling out possible health risks. Adding to the uncertainty in the cannabis light market, the Supreme Court of Cassation ruled in May 2019 that the sale of derivatives of cannabis sativa which do not fall within the scope of the Law 242/16, most notably oils, resins, buds, and leaves, is illegal under Italian Law unless such products are effectively devoid of narcotic effects. The Court also reaffirmed that only certain agricultural varieties of cannabis are permitted under the Law 242/16, which was meant to benefit farmers growing industrial hemp.

In 2019, a team of economists from the University of Magna Graecia, Université Catholique de Louvain, and the Erasmus School of Economics published a study on the effect of light cannabis liberalization in Italy on the organized crime. Albeit light cannabis does not generate hype as illegal marijuana, the study showed that confiscations of illegal marijuana declined with the opening of light cannabis shops. The authors also found a reduction in the number of confiscations of hashish and plants of marijuana along with a reduction of arrests for drug-related offenses. Forgone revenues for criminal organizations were estimated to be at least 90–170 million euros per year. Conversely, the total revenue from the cannabis light market was estimated to be more than 200 million euros in 2020.

International treaties

On 2 December 2020, under the recommendation of the World Health Organization (WHO), the UN Commission on Narcotic Drugs (CND) voted to remove both cannabis and cannabis resin from the Schedule IV classification of the aforementioned 1961 UN Convention, while still including them both in the less strict Schedule I category. In its capacity as a serving member of the CND, and in agreement with other members of the EU, with the exception of Hungary, Italy voted in favor of the rescheduling proposal, since it would allow more research, in line with our evidence-based drugs policy, on the medical use of cannabis and cannabis resin.

Among the other recommendations of the WHO, there was the proposed addition of a footnote to the Schedule I section of the Convention, stating that preparations containing predominantly cannabidiol and not more than 0.2 per cent of delta-9-tetrahydrocannabinol are not under international control. However, the proposal was ultimately rejected by a majority of member states for several reasons, including the argument that no action is needed on CBD since it is not currently under international control. In this case, Italy voted against the recommended footnote, citing as reasons the lack of scientific evidence on the proposed 0.2% limit, ambiguous wordings within the draft that could lead to divergent interpretations, and the absence of justification for the proposed different treatment of cannabidiol compared to other non-psychoactive cannabinoids.

Personal use

In July 2008, the Supreme Court of Cassation ruled that followers of the Rastafari religion can smoke marijuana as a meditative herb after a man from Perugia, who was initially sentenced in 2004 to 16 months in jail and a €4,000 (4,900 US$) fine for possession of 97 g of marijuana, was acquitted on religious grounds. In December 2019, the Court ruled that cultivating domestically small amounts of cannabis for the exclusive use of the grower is legal under Italian Law, after being asked to clarify previous conflicting interpretations of the law. The ruling did not specify what constitutes a legally allowed small amount of cannabis, however the defendant involved was initially sentenced by a lower court to one year in prison and a €3,000 (3,900 US$) fine for the possession of two plants.

The Court argued that public health is not threatened by a single cannabis user cultivating a few plants in a domestic setting and, in order to justify the assessment of a personal use of the plants, it pointed out the small size of the cultivation. In particular, the Court argued that, given the rudimental techniques used, the small number of plants present, the modest achievable amount of the final product, and the lack of evidence connecting it to a larger narcotic market, the cultivation appeared to be destined exclusively for the personal use of the defendant, and should therefore be considered excluded from the application of the penal code. The ruling came just days after a proposed amendment to the 2020 budget calling for legalisation and regulation of domestic cannabis use, although already approved by the Lower House, was ruled inadmissible by the President of the Senate on technical grounds.

In April 2021, a patient with acute rheumatoid arthritis was acquitted of drug pushing after a court ruled that he was allowed to exceed the legal limits of cannabis cultivation, after running out of an adequate supply of medical cannabis due to the COVID-19 pandemic, on the grounds that it was for his personal health use. As of July 2021, another patient with fibromyalgia, for which a daily dose of one gram of medical cannabis is usually prescribed, is currently on trial for the same charge of drug trafficking, after two cannabis plants were found in his house, together with rudimental tools for cultivating, preserving, and weighing cannabis, as well as a stock of the final product sufficient for just above a month of therapy, with a THC content ranging between 0.32% and 2.38%. The defendant lives in Calabria which, similarly to Molise and Aosta Valley, has not yet approved for medical cannabis to be covered by its Regional Health Agency, thus leading to higher costs and a distribution limited to a few pharmacies. Moreover, critics have argued that such charges would lead patients to buy cannabis directly from illegal pushers instead of growing it themselves, since they would risk just a fine, confiscation of documents, and a mandatory rehabilitation program for the charge of possession, as opposed to 6 years in prison for drug pushing. In fact, a third of all the illegal marijuana produced in Italy is reportedly cultivated in Calabria, due to its favorable climate, with the 'Ndrangheta being the leading criminal organization for drug trafficking in both Italy and Europe.

In September 2021, a preliminary text was approved by the Justice Committee in the Lower House that would decriminalize the small-scale cultivation of up to four female cannabis plants at home for exclusively personal use. The stated aim of the proposed legislation is to make sure that patients have access to medical cannabis, as well as to combat criminal organizations involved in drug trafficking. The law would also lower the penalties for minor cannabis-related infractions from 2–6 years in prison to 1 year at most, thus distinguishing it from hard drugs like heroin, while it would increase penalties related to drug trafficking to 6–10 years.

2021 decriminalization initiative

At the same time, a ballot initiative was launched that aimed at the decriminalization of the cultivation of marijuana, as well as the repeal of penalties for cannabis possession, by amending the relevant laws through a referendum. According to Article 75 of the Constitution, general referendums are allowed for repealing a law or part of it, when they are requested by either 500 thousand voters or five Regional Councils, while neither propositional referendums nor referendums on a law regulating taxes, the budget, amnesty or pardon, or a law ratifying an international treaty are recognised. Therefore, the legislative process regarding the legalization of recreational cannabis can only go through Parliament. Instead, the objective of the campaign was to amend several articles of the DPR 309/90, regarding the discipline of narcotics and psychotropic substances, prevention, treatment, and rehabilitation of the related stages of substance dependence, which is reportedly responsible for 35% of the current prison population in Italy. The initiative was supported by several pro-legalization organizations, including ARCI and the Luca Coscioni Association, as well as several political parties, including Italian Radicals, +Europa, Possible, Power to the People, Communist Refoundation, and Italian Left.

In its first week of operation, the campaign collected 400 thousand signatures in less than four days and reached the required 500 thousand signatures well before the deadline set at the end of September, which would have allowed the referendum to take place as early as spring 2022. The speed at which the signatures were collected was made possible by a law approved in July 2021 that allows for signatures to be collected online, while previously only in-person signing was allowed, and the campaigners continued to collect signatures up until the deadline, in order to make sure that the initiative would not be rejected due to some of them being ruled invalid. In fact, the campaign managed to collect as much as 630 thousand electronic signatures in a single week, 70% of which were from people under 35 years old.

As prescribed by the law, the collected signatures were verified by the Supreme Court of Cassation on 12 January 2022, however the Constitutional Court ruled on 16 February 2022 that the ballot question was inadmissible, thus preventing the referendum from going forward. The Court argued that the proposed changes to the legislation would not have affected just the cultivation of marijuana, but also of plants like poppy and coca, from which opioids and cocaine can be derived. These potential changes to legislation regarding hard drugs would have violated international obligations, and therefore were ruled not in line with the constitutional provisions on referendums in Italy.

2022 general election campaign

Following the removal of the cannabis decriminalization proposal from the referendum of 12 June 2022, the issue resurfaced during the campaign for the snap general election that was held on 25 September 2022, after the resignation of the then Prime Minister Mario Draghi on 21 July 2022. In terms of public opinion, Italy is the country with the highest support in Europe for legal, government-regulated sales of cannabis products to customers over the age of 18, with an estimated 60% of the people being in favor of it, 22% being against it, and 16% neither supporting nor opposing the policy, according to a 2022 report published by the consultancy agency Hanway Associates, in collaboration with Curaleaf International, the Cansativa Group, and the international commercial law firm Ince.

During the campaign period, an analysis of the different political platforms divided the various parties between those that were explicitly in favor of legalization and regulation of recreational cannabis, which included Possible, the Democratic Party, the Five Star Movement, the People's Union, the Greens and Left Alliance, and +Europa; those that did not touch the subject, which included Action – Italia Viva, Brothers of Italy, Forza Italia, and Italexit; and the only one that was publicly and unambiguously against it, namely the League.

Even though the Brothers of Italy party, led by the subsequently-elected Prime Minister Giorgia Meloni, did not explicitly mention cannabis legalization during their campaign, other than labeling the drug as one of the youthful deviances that need to be tackled with the promotion of healthy lifestyles, their leader had discussed the subject multiple times in the past. In particular, she discussed the lethality of drugs in general; the need for actions to contrast their spread; and her dismissal of the idea of drug legalization as a means to fight the Mafia, citing the similar position held by the late anti-mafia magistrate Paolo Borsellino. Similarly, the League party led by Matteo Salvini, which went on to form the resulting coalition government together with both Brothers of Italy and Forza Italia, campaigned on the position of stopping any decriminalization or legalization proposal; dismissing any distinction between hard and soft drugs, echoed in the often-used slogan Drug is Death; and launching sensibilization campaigns aimed at minors and their parents, regarding the dangers of the drug culture, and in particular the effects of the habitual use of cannabis on the cognitive development of the youths.

In contrast, the most fervently pro-legalization platform, published by Possible, pointed at the case study of Portugal which, according to a 2017 report by the IZA Institute of Labor Economics, experienced a decrease in both the number of drug-related deaths, and the number of new patients entering drug rehabilitation, following its decriminalizion of all drugs in 2001. Similarly, the other proponents reiterated the need to legalize cannabis cultivation for personal use in the context of both fighting organized crime, and ensuring that medical cannabis is available to patients in need, as well as a matter of individual liberties. Other proposals also include the launching of information and prevention campaigns for schools, as well as the wider public, in order to increase the public awareness regarding the risks of any form of substance abuse and dependence.

In regard to the private sector, the non-partisan Confederation of Italian Farmers (CIF) association published a 10-points document addressed to all political parties, lobbying for clear regulations regarding cannabis, among other things, as a means to support plant growers in the context of the 2021–2023 global energy crisis and inflation surge. In particular, Italy ranks 3rd in the European Union in terms of the production of plants and flowers, with the internal market worth an estimated 3 billion euros in revenues, creating more than 100,000 jobs spread among 24,000 businesses; and the main challenge faced by the sector was reported to be a 74% increase in the production costs, combined with the general inflation and the loss of purchasing power by the consumers, which resulted in reductions in sales of as much as 30%. In the published document, cannabis is recognized as a plant with enormous potentials in every field, that still suffers from unclear regulations; and for this reasons the CIF requested the future government to allow credit access for hemp-producing businesses, the liberalization of the sale of CBD, the agamic reproduction of hemp plants, investments into new varieties for different uses, the processing of all parts of the plant, the definition of a THC level below which all parts of the plant are marketable, and the reorganization of the means of production for cannabis-based pharmaceuticals.

Law enforcement

Cannabis inflorescences are classified as narcotics and their pharmaceutical use is strictly regulated in accordance with the aforementioned UN Conventions of 1961 and 1971, EU regulations, as well as national legislation, including the aforementioned DPR 309/90 of 1990. The cultivation of cannabis plants for pharmaceutical use, as well as the production and distribution of cannabis-based medicine, are allowed only for authorized entities, while the DPR 309/90 forbids both the direct and indirect advertisement of a list of derived substances. Nevertheless, farmers can cultivate cannabis for exclusively non-pharmaceutical purposes, such as the production of fibers or other industrial applications, using certified seeds under the direction of the Ministry of Agricultural, Food, and Forestry Policies (MAF).

Central Office for Narcotics
In November 2015, Italy instituted the Central Office for Narcotics, in accordance with the 1961 UN Convention and subsequent amendments, which instruct countries allowing the cultivation of cannabis for medical purposes to create a state agency for its management. The functions of the Central Office for Narcotics include:
 implementing national and EU regulations regarding narcotics and psychoactive drugs;
 updating the official list of narcotics and psychoactive substances;
 authorizing the cultivation of cannabis for the production of medicine and other substances;
 approving areas dedicated to the cultivation of cannabis;
 approving the exportation, importation, distribution within the national territory, and storage of cannabis plants and derived materials, with the exception of stocks kept in facilities authorized for the production of medicine;
 determining the production quotas based on Regional requests, and relaying that information to the International Narcotics Control Board.

Central Directorate for Anti-Drug Services

The Central Directorate for Anti-Drug Services (CDA) is a joint organization involving the State Police, the Carabinieri, and the Financial Guard, as well as civil administration personnel from the Ministry of Interior, in the fight against drug trafficking. The three law enforcement agencies are equally represented in the Directorate, with the general director being selected every three years from the three agencies on a rotational basis. The Directorate was originally instituted as the Anti-Drug Directorate through the Law 685/75 of 1975, and underwent several changes over the years, becoming the Central Anti-Drug Services through the Law 121/81 of 1981, until the Law 16/91 of 1991 defined its current structure and functions. The Directorate is made of three main branches, each containing two Divisions.

The General and International Affairs (GIA) branch manages multilateral, training, and legislative initiatives, as well as providing technical support to the Judiciary Police. International initiatives are coordinated with the United Nations, the European Union, as well as other agencies including the G7 Rome-Lyon Group, the Maritime Analysis and Operations Centre, Ameripol, the Paris Pact Initiative, and the International Drug Enforcement Conference. The GIA branch manages training and educational activities at both a national and international level through courses, conferences, and workshops; and it also gives technical-juridical advice with regards to bills and regulations on narcotics and drug trafficking.

The Studies, Research, and Information (SRI) branch conducts research and intelligence activities, in particular monitoring national and international drug trafficking. The analysis includes local consumption statistics, trafficking routes, production and market areas, concealment methods, demographics of the people involved, and evolution of new narcotics. At the international level, the SRI branch collaborates with the International Narcotics Control Board. It also gathers and processes information from both national and foreign sources regarding drug-related confiscations, arrests, and deaths, subsequently relaying these data to the National Statistics System (SISTAN), as well as using them for internal reports. Finally, the SRI branch offers support upon request in terms of providing bibliographical references for academic and research purposes.

The Anti-Drug Operations (ADO) branch coordinates police activities against drug trafficking through intelligence, strategic, operational, and technical-logistical support both at a national and international level. The ADO branch also approves and coordinates undercover operations, manages naval boarding requests against suspicious vessels in international waters, and monitors internet activities related to drug trafficking.

Illegal drug trade
The main narcotic substances obtained from the female inflorescences and resin of cannabis plants are marijuana, hashish, and hashish oil. According to the CDA, the major marijuana producers worldwide are Albania, supplying Italy and parts of Europe; Mexico and the United States, mainly supplying North America; and Paraguay, which represents the main distribution center for all of South America; while Morocco represents the main producer of hashish. Moreover, the three main routes for the illegal trade of cannabis-derived substances are from Mexico towards the United States and Canada; from North Africa, through Spain, towards the European markets; and from Albania, through the Adriatic Sea, towards Italy and other European markets. Furthermore, the Italian black market for marijuana is also supplied by the Netherlands, as well as local producers.

Medical cannabis

Since 1998, doctors in Italy have been able to prescribe cannabis products and synthetic cannabinoids for therapeutic use, with a non-repeatable
prescription, while the therapeutic uses of THC, dronabinol, and nabilone are recognized since 2007. After the inclusion of the active compounds of cannabis plant origin in the Medical Table by Ministerial Decree on 23 January 2013, doctors in Italy are able to prescribe cannabis-based medicine and any pharmacy, if properly supplied, can distribute cannabis products in the forms and doses defined in the doctor's prescription. Medical cannabis can be used for treating several conditions, and its prescription is allowed when the patient is unresponsive to conventional or standard therapies, while the list of medical applications includes:
 relieving both oncological and neuropathic chronic pain, including pain associated with cancer, multiple sclerosis, spinal cord injuries, and diabetic neuropathy;
 treating nausea and vomiting caused by chemotherapy, radiotherapy, and HIV treatments;
 stimulating appetite for patients with cachexia, anorexia, cancer, and AIDS;
 inducing hypotension within glaucomas;
 managing neurological diseases, such as spasticity caused by multiple sclerosis, levodopa-related dyskinesia caused by Parkinson's disease, extra-choreic disturbances caused by Huntington's disease, involuntary movements caused by Tourette syndrome, as well as some forms of epilepsy.
There are three methods to administer cannabis-based medicine, namely infusions that can be normally sipped, oil extracts that can be spread on bread, and decoctions, the latter being less common since their packaging is more complicated. The reported list of possible side effects derived from the consumption of medical cannabis include tachycardia, hypotension, paranoia, dizziness, reduction in the cognitive development and psychomotor performance, alteration of attention and memory, psychiatric disorders, damage to the airways and lungs, risk of addiction, and weight reduction in newborn babies if used during pregnancy.

The cost of medical cannabis is completely covered by the Healthcare system for six medical conditions, while for others it can be purchased from pharmacies at a greatly reduced price. Furthermore, in June 2017, the Ministry of Health established a maximum price for medical cannabis between €8.50 (9.1 US$) and €9.00 (9.7 US$) per gram, in order to standardize the expenses sustained by patients. However, this price cap has resulted in a short supply of the product due to limited profit margins for pharmacies, while regional legislative differences also add to the overall complexity of the cannabis market. For example, the Regions have the ability to decide for which health conditions the drug can or cannot be prescribed, and they can also increase local prices in order to make it profitable for pharmacies to sell medical cannabis (e.g. Trentino-Alto Adige/Südtirol), or alternatively they can completely cover the cost for patients through their Regional Health Agencies (e.g. Sicily). As a comparison, the cost of medical cannabis imported from the Netherlands is reported between €5 (5.3 US$) and €10 (10.7 US$) per gram.

State-produced medical cannabis

At the time of the legalization of medical cannabis, the cost of the medicine wasn't covered by the State and the drug had to be imported from abroad through the Office of Medicinal Cannabis, primarily from the Netherlands, making it too expensive for the average patient to buy legally at pharmacies, with prices reaching up to €50 (59 US$) per gram, as well as waiting times reaching up to a month. For this reason, then Defence Minister Roberta Pinotti announced in September 2014 that the Army would begin growing cannabis plants in a secure room at the Chemical-Pharmaceutical Military Institute in Florence, which is already tasked with the production of orphan drugs both as an application of the constitutional right to health care and as a matter of national security. The military facility manages all stages of the production of medical cannabis, including growing and harvesting the plants, drying and grinding the leaves, sanitizing the final product with gamma rays, and then shipping it to pharmacies and hospitals, all in accordance with the Good Agricultural and Collecting Practices and the Good Manufacturing Practices of the EU.

The increased production was also achieved thanks to the increase in the number of growrooms, from just two in 2016 to the current ten, as well as the six annual harvests carried out in each one of the six flowering rooms, which individually contain between 50 and 125 cannabis plants.

The state-run production and distribution of medical cannabis is the result of a collaboration between the Ministries of Health and Defence, as well as other entities including the MAF; the Regions; the Italian Medicines Agency; the Superior Institute of Health; and qualified experts. The operation is overseen by the Defence Industries Agency, which is the arm of the Ministry of Defence that handles the commercialization of the State’s defense enterprises, while its aim is to ensure the availability of the raw material; guarantee the safe preparation and use of cannabis-based medicine; prevent the use of unauthorized, illegal, or counterfeit products; and make therapies affordable by reducing the cost of cannabis. In particular, the final price of the product being sold to pharmacies by the military facility, which is just based on the estimated production costs, is equal to €6.88 (7.39 US$) per gram, not including the VAT. The military facility currently produces two registered types of cannabis-based ingredients, which are then distributed to pharmacies in a minced form to be used in their formulations.

The first product is Cannabis FM2 (a.k.a. Farmaceutico Militare 2, i.e. Military Pharmaceutical 2), which is similar to the Bediol strain; consists of unfertilized, dried, and milled female inflorescences; and has been available to the Regions since 14 December 2016. The THC content of Cannabis FM2 (i.e. between 5% and 8%) is lower than the levels commonly found in similar drugs sold in the black market, or even in those legally imported from the Netherlands, while its CBD content (i.e. between 7.5% and 12%) is comparatively higher due to its more useful anti-inflammatory properties. There are also minimal contents of cannabigerol, cannabichromene, and tetrahydrocannabivarin, for a total percentage of less than 1%. Since July 2018, Cannabis FM1, which is similar to the Bedrocan variety, has also been available to the Regions, and it shows a considerably higher THC content (i.e. between 13% and 20%), as well as a considerably lower CBD content (i.e. less than 1%). The higher THC content makes Cannabis FM1 more suitable to mitigate the symptoms of conditions like multiple sclerosis. In 2023, the facility is also aiming to produce cannabis-infused olive oil, which patients can take in drop forms.

Chemical-Pharmaceutical Military Institute

The origins of the Chemical-Pharmaceutical Military Institute in Florence date back to 1853 in the Kingdom of Sardinia, when the General Chemical-Pharmaceutical Laboratory was established in Turin by royal decree, as part of the Military Pharmacy Warehouse, in order to provide the military with the medical supplies and medications needed, as well as combating diseases like malaria, which was widespread in Italy at the time. After the Great War, plans were made to modernize the Laboratory, and move it to a more central location within the Italian peninsula, in order to improve the distribution of supplies. The current facility, covering about 55,000 m2, was thus constructed in Florence, becoming operational in October 1931, and producing several types of medicine, medical supplies, cosmetics, and food products, with a workforce peaking at 2,000 people in the 1940s.

Renamed the Chemical-Pharmaceutical Military Institute in 1976, beside the production of medical cannabis, the institute also produces five different orphan drugs, as well as maintaining the national stockpile of antidotes in case of mass poisoning, terrorist attacks, and nuclear disasters, in collaboration with the Ministry of Health which manages a net of warehouses located in each Region. In particular, the facility was involved in relief efforts during several natural and man-made disasters, including the Florence flood of 1966, the Friuli earthquake of 1976, the Irpinia earthquake of 1980, as well as the Chernobyl nuclear disaster of 1986, for which the institute produced 500 thousand pills of potassium iodide in less than 24 hours, in order to combat the thyroid damage caused by Iodine-131. The facility has also been involved in the production of medicine and medical supplies for international assistance, such as during the Romanian revolution of December 1989. More recently, the Army's activities facilitated a steady increase of its involvement in the public health sector, that further accelerated during the COVID-19 pandemic, for which military personnel was charged to set up treatment tents and transport vaccines.

The military facility is a non-profit institute, operating on a balanced budget since 2008 and reinvesting any surplus into research and production, and collaborating with several Italian universities in several fields of research and education. In order to avoid unfair competition with the private sector, the facility mainly focuses on the research and production of unprofitable drugs used to cure rare diseases, which are defined as affecting just one every 2,000 people. In particular, the army-produced orphan drugs currently supply just 3,000 people in all of Italy, although possible revenue may still be obtained from exporting such drugs, with potential customers numbering at least 400 million people worldwide. With regards to the production of medical cannabis, the facility is looking for a public–private partnership in order to increase the overall production, possibly reaching  a year, thus covering the national demand while also providing export opportunities. Currently, five private firms are set to supply the facility with more mother plants, from which cuttings can be taken in order to produce more plants; however, there are still no plans to outsource the main operation to the private sector.

Private sector

The potential revenue from medicinal cannabis is estimated to be more than 1.4 billion euros, with the internal market creating at least 10,000 jobs and reducing the dependence on imports. In February 2021, Bio Hemp Farming, which is a consortium between the Bio Hemp Trade company and the Palma d'Oro cooperative, became the first private entity in Italy to be granted authorization by the Ministry of Health to grow medical cannabis and to extract its active principles for pharmaceutical purposes. The leaves and inflorescences harvested from these sites are sent to two pharmaceutical laboratories for the extraction of cannabidiol for medical purposes, while the stems and fiber are instead used for industrial purposes, such as the production of paper, yarns, or biomaterial for construction. An innovative method implemented by the consortium, for the extraction of active principles from medical cannabis, is a cryogenic process in which the low temperatures allow to reduce the preparation time for the final product from 2 or 3 days to about 15 minutes.

Another noteworthy application of cannabis-based medications is in dermatology; for instance, a novel cosmetic line by the Swiss lifescience company Crystal Hemp combines CBD with resveratrol, azelo-glycine, and lactobionic acid, in order to regulate the production of sebum in sebaceous glands, reduce redness of the skin, and inducing exfoliation. As a result, the combined effect of these substances can help prevent acne, assist in the replacement of dead cells, and alleviate the worst symptoms of skin conditions like seborrhoeic dermatitis. In particular, dedicated studies show that CBD is able to inhibit the lipogenic action of several substances that can be found in cell tissues, reduce the proliferation of sebocytes, and have an anti-inflammatory effect on cells affected by acne.

Consumption statistics

The Ministry of Health also publishes consumption statistics for medical cannabis both at a national and a regional level, based on regional distribution requests and the authorized sale of the product, and the military facility determines its production quotas by taking into account the consumption data from the previous two years, as well as the yearly increases. The high demand caused pharmacies throughout Italy to run out of medical cannabis by September 2017, prompting many patients with prescriptions to turn to the black market, while in January 2018 the importation of cannabis was extended to Canada. Currently, imports of medical cannabis from the Netherlands, Canada, Denmark, and Germany are used to compensate for the deficit in the internal production.

In October 2019, the first public clinic specifically dedicated to the prescription of medical cannabis was established in Naples by the University of Campania, in order to facilitate access to it by patients, who previously had to rely on either a private clinic at a cost, or a specialist familiar with cannabis-based drugs. However, only a few tens of thousands of patients have access to cannabis-based drugs, while the COVID-19 pandemic has affected both the importation and the distribution of the medicine. In regard to international travel, a decree issued by the Ministry of Health on 16 November 2007 details all the rules and procedures that should be followed, in order to allow the carrying of small quantities of medical preparations containing narcotic drugs and psychotropic substances for personal use. In particular, whether they are leaving or entering Italy, travellers carrying small quantities of medical preparations that contain internationally controlled substances are required to hold certain documents, such as a valid medical prescription, attesting that such preparations were lawfully obtained in the country of departure.

Industrial cannabis

In 2016, Italy removed the need for authorization to grow certified hemp with levels of THC below 0.2%, while also providing tax incentives and including a research and development funding up to €700,000 (826,000 US$) per year from the MAF. Moreover, a Common Agricultural Policy payment ranging between €250 (285 US$) and €400 (457 US$) per hectare can be granted to Italian hemp growers, and this does not include further possible local funding independently allocated by the various Regions and comuni.

In regard to research and development, as opposed to farmers, the previously mentioned Law 242/16 allows public research institutes to reproduce for a year the certified hemp seeds that were purchased in the previous year. In particular, the replanted seeds can be used to grow small amounts of hemp for either demonstrative, experimental, or cultural purposes, which are nevertheless subject to communication to the MAF. Furthermore, the legislation also encourages educational activities, such as training for those who operate in the supply chain for industrial cannabis, in order to illustrate the properties of hemp plants, as well as their use in the agronomic, agroindustrial, nutraceutical, bio-building, biocomponent, and packaging fields.

In fact, the aim of the Law 242/16 is to stimulate the production of industrial hemp in the country, as well as to offer an alternative to the cultivation of wheat for farmers damaged by low prices, desiccated lands, and competition from large corporations importing grain from abroad. In particular, the potential profit from the cultivation of hemp in Italy is estimated between €600 (700 US$) and more than €2,500 (2,900 US$) per hectare, while the estimated yield for durum wheat is equal to €300 (350 US$) per hectare. Moreover, as a consequence of the increasing number of farmers turning to hemp cultivations, the overall production of durum wheat in Italy decreased by more than 4% in 2017. Nevertheless, producers of hemp fiber in Italy still face significant competition from the low-price fiber produced in China, as well as other Asian countries.

Private sector

The cultivation of industrial hemp with minimal levels of psychoactive compounds has several commercial applications, including food, fabrics, clothing, biofuel, building materials, as well as animal feed and bedding. The main hemp varieties cultivated in Italy include Antal, Asso, Carma, Carmagnola, Carmagnola Selezionata, Carmaleonte, Codimono, Dioica 88, Eletta Campana, Fedora 19, Felina 32, Fibranova, Fibrante, Finola, Futura 75, Glecia, Gliana, Juzo 31, Kompolti, Superfibra, Tiborszallasi, Tisza, Uso 31, and Villanova. The Fibranova cultivar was developed in the 1950s as a cross between Bredemann Eletta and Carmagnola, the Bredemann Eletta variety was developed at the Max Planck Institut using hemp strains originating from Northern and Central Russia, while the Eletta Campana resulted from a cross between the Carmagnola landrace and German cultivars, most likely Fibridia.

In regard to the construction industry, building materials that can be derived from hemp include mortar, plaster, finishing products, thermally insulating panels, bricks, and ecobricks, as well as hemp-cement and hemp-lime biocomposites. Moreover, hemp concrete is a carbon sequester, since the amount of carbon stored in the material is higher than the emissions generated during its production, and it continues to store carbon during the building's life. This could have significant applications in Italy, where the construction sector is worth 237 billion euros, and alone is responsible for 30% of the total CO₂ emissions in the country.

Other hemp-derived products include oils used in cosmetics, wax, paint, soap, detergents, paper, packaging materials, pellet fuels for a clean combustion, as well as natural resins and fabrics that can be used for clothing due to their thermal properties, and for furnitures due to their resistance. Although hemp fabrics have historically been associated with rough and stiff clothes, nowadays they can be turned into light and soft textiles, after appropriate treatments and processing through dedicated machinery. Moreover, hemp paper is considered to be a more sustainable alternative to paper made from wood-pulp, since hemp stalks only take up to five months to mature, while hemp paper does not necessarily require toxic bleaching chemicals, and it can be recycled up to seven or eight times. Furthermore, as a good substitute for plastic due to their light weight and durability, hemp-derived products can be used in different sectors, such as car manufacturing, railway, aviation, and aerospace.

In February 2022, a collaboration protocol was signed between Coldiretti Toscana and the Vecchiano start-up CanapaFiliera, which aims to revamp the hemp industry in Tuscany. More specifically, the start-up would provide the seeds to the agricultural businesses participating in the project, which would then manage the cultivation of hemp as a rotational crop between the months of March and July, as part of a circular economy model.

Food and beverages

In Italy, certified hemp plants can be used for both industrial and ornamental purposes, however food products can only be derived from the hemp seeds, since they have no THC content, while the consumption of hemp flowers and leaves is still prohibited. Nevertheless, considering that the demand for hemp-based food was estimated in 2021 to have grown by 500% since 2017, the production chain derived from hemp could significantly grow the Italian food industry, which is worth 50 billion euros in exports alone and is considered one of the pillars of the Italian economy.

Furthermore, in terms of the nutritional value, hemp seeds contain all essential amino acids in optimal proportions and in an easily digestible form, as well as high levels of protein and considerable amounts of fibers, vitamins, Omega-3, and minerals; and the wide range of edible products includes biscuits, taralli, bread, flour, anti-inflammatory oil, ricotta, tofu, and beer. The elevated protein content also makes cannabis-based food a suitable meat replacement for vegetarians, while its intense flavour has even been used for gelato, chocolate bars, and pastries.

In 2017, the first hemp wine from Europe started being produced on a small scale in the Marches, as a result of a local collaboration between the Cantina Monte Schiavo winery and the Canapa Verde agency. Although technically not classified as a wine, as far as the Italian law is concerned, the Canavì combines Verdicchio grapes and cannabis sativa plants with a 0.4% THC content, resulting in a flavored beverage that was inspired by the particularly sought-after and expensive marijuana-infused wines that can be found in California.

Environmental benefits

Another significant application of industrial cannabis is soil decontamination through phytoremediation, a process in which contaminants are absorbed by the fast-growing roots of hemp plants, which store the toxins or even transform them into a harmless substance, without the need of removing and processing large quantities of soil, as with more traditional methods. Cannabis plants are particularly suitable for phytoremediation, since their roots have a high resistance to heavy metals and therefore they can store them in higher quantities (e.g. more than 100 mg/kg in the case of cadmium), with the younger roots producing phytochelatins for detoxification after the excessive absorption of these metals. Other similar projects have been tested in several sites in Brescia, in Sardinia, and in the Land of Pyres near Naples.

Given this significant soil enrichment, when turning the cultivation within a field from cannabis plants to other crops, the resulting yield tend to significantly increase with respect to more traditional crop rotations. For example, in some cases, the production of wheat can increase by as much as 20% with respect to what it would have been, had the same field previously been growing either grass or chard. Furthermore, hemp plants can help to break the cycle of diseases when used in crop rotation, their fast growth and shading capacity prevent the growth of weeds, and the dense foliage just three weeks after germination constitutes a natural soil cover, which reduces water loss and protects against soil erosion.

Hemp plants also consume a significant amount of CO₂, so much so that the gas is sometimes artificially added to indoor cultivations in order to increase the resulting yield. In fact, hemp is seen as a potential new protagonist of Italian agriculture, in order to achieve the objectives of EU 2030, which aim at a 40% decrease in greenhouse gas emissions compared to 1990.

Plant deseases and pests

Despite the aforementioned lower need for pesticides with respect to other crops, hemp plants can still be threatened by a certain number of pests at different stages of their development, as previously discussed. In regard to plant deseases, symptoms of white root rot were identified on hemp plants of the Kompolti variety, during a sanitary survey carried out at a private farm in the Province of Naples in 2019. The infected plants were collected for further analyses at the CREA phytosanitary laboratory in Caserta, where death occurred in 10% of the cases, generally within 2–3 weeks after the appearance of the first symptoms, which subsequently deteriorated into yellowing, canopy wilt, as well as signs of roots covered with white mycelium and fan-like mycelium under the bark.

The causal agent was isolated from small root segments and identified as the Rosellinia necatrix, in reportedly the first known European case of this fungus infecting hemp plants. As the surveyed farm is reported to have historically produced apples for over 30 years, an adaptation of the fungus to the new host has been hypothesized.

See also
Adult lifetime cannabis use by country
Annual cannabis use by country
History of cannabis
History of medical cannabis
Legality of cannabis
Legality of cannabis by country

Footnotes

References

External links

Traditional hemp rope production
 Italian hemp industry - No sound. Author - British Movietone. Date - April 30, 1944. (Archive footage - no sound)

Veneto
 Benvenuti nell'Antica Corderia della Famiglia Verona a Thiene, Vicenza. Author - The Ancient Corderia of the Verona Family in Thiene, Vicenza, Italy. Published - January 19, 2021. (in Italian - See Traditional hemp rope production for clarity)

Piedmont
 Il Sentiero della Canapa. Author - Polytechnic University of Turin - Audiovisual Teaching Service. Published - Unspecified. (in Italian)

Campania
 British Pathé - Making Rope. Author - British Pathé. Date - 1950s. (Archive footage - in Italian)
 US soldiers watch as Italian workers beat hemp crop in the backyard of a house in Frattamaggiore, Italy.. Author - CriticalPast. Date - January 14, 1944. (Archive footage - no sound)

Sicily
 La grotta dei Cordai. Author - Istituto Luce Cinecittà. Published - January, 1935. (Archive footage - in Italian)
 Grotta dei Cordari - Sicilia - Siracusa. Author - Istituto Luce Cinecittà. Date - Unspecified. (Archive footage - no narration)

Italian hemp production
 La canapa. Author - Archivio Nazionale Cinema Impresa. Published - 1959. (Archive footage - in Italian - See Hemp fiber production and Hemp farming techniques for clarity)
 Non finiscono nella padella. Author - Istituto Luce Cinecittà. Published - April 30, 1954. (Archive footage - in Italian)
 Lavorazione della canapa. Author - Istituto Luce Cinecittà. Published - September 5, 1940. (Archive footage - in Italian)
 La coltura della canapa nella provincia di Caserta. Author - Istituto Luce Cinecittà. Published - October 14, 1936. (Archive footage - in Italian)
 La coltivazione della canapa. Author - Istituto Luce Cinecittà. Published - March 27, 1935. (Archive footage - in Italian)

Industrial hemp products
 Giornalisti e addetti commerciali esteri visitano alcuni stabilimenti tessili dove si lavorano le fibre naturali e artificiali di produzione nazionale. Author - Istituto Luce Cinecittà. Published - December 9, 1936. (Archive footage - in Italian)
 L'inaugurazione della Mostra della Canapa. Author - Istituto Luce Cinecittà. Published - June 19, 1935. (Archive footage - in Italian)

Italian hemp in the United Kingdom
 The re-rigging of Nelson's "Victory". Author - British Movietone. Published - July 20, 1964. (Archive footage)
 Portsmouth. "Victory" Re-Rigged. Author - British Pathé. Date - 1964. (Archive footage)
 New rigging for the "Victory". Author - British Movietone. Published - April 23, 1962. (Archive footage)

Italy
Politics of Italy
Drugs in Italy